This is a list of coups d'état and coup attempts by country, listed in chronological order. A coup is an attempt to illegally overthrow the government of a country. Scholars generally consider a coup successful when the usurpers are able to maintain control of the government for at least seven days.

Afghanistan 
February 20, 1919: Nasrullah Khan overthrows Habibullah Khan
February 28, 1919: Amanullah Khan overthrows Nasrullah Khan
January 17, 1929: Habibullah Kalakani overthrows Inayatullah Khan
October 16, 1929: Mohammed Nadir Shah overthrows Habibullāh Kalakāni
July 17, 1973: Mohammed Daoud Khan overthrows Mohammed Zahir Shah
December 9, 1976: Qiyam-i Islami (Islamic Uprising) attempts and fails to overthrow Mohammed Daoud Khan
April 30, 1978: Abdul Qadir overthrows Mohammed Daoud Khan
September 16, 1979: Hafizullah Amin overthrows Nur Muhammad Taraki
December 27, 1979: Babrak Karmal overthrows Hafizullah Amin
March 6, 1990: Shahnawaz Tanai attempts and fails to overthrow Mohammad Najibullah

Albania 
September 14, 1998: The funeral of MP Azem Hajdari turns violent as the office of the Albanian Prime Minister Fatos Nano is attacked, obliging the latter to hastily flee and step down shortly after. His party remains in power.

Algeria 
July 3, 1962: Houari Boumédiène and Ahmed Ben Bella overthrow Benyoucef Benkhedda
June 19, 1965: Houari Boumédiène overthrows Ahmed Ben Bella
January 11, 1992: Khaled Nezzar overthrows Chadli Bendjedid

Angola 
1977 Angolan coup d'état attempt: The Minister of Interior Nito Alves fails to overthrow Agostinho Neto.

Argentina 

6 September 1930: General José Félix Uriburu and the Nacionalistas overthrow President Hipólito Yrigoyen and suspend the 1853 Constitution. 
18 December 1932: failed military uprising against Agustín Pedro Justo by Atilio Cattáneo and the Radical Civic Union
4 June 1943: the military overthrows president Ramón Castillo
28 September 1951: failed military revolt against President Juan Perón by Benjamín Menéndez
16–23 September 1955: the military led by General Eduardo Lonardi overthrows president Juan Perón
6 June 1956: failed military uprising, led by General Juan José Valle, against de facto President Pedro Eugenio Aramburu
19 June 1959: failed military uprising against Arturo Frondizi by 
30 November 1960: failed military uprising against Arturo Frondizi by 
29 March 1962: the military, led by General , overthrows president Arturo Frondizi
28 June 1966: a military uprising led by General Juan Carlos Onganía overthrows president Arturo Umberto Illia
18–22 December 1975: failed military uprising against Isabel Perón by 
24 March 1976: Jorge Videla overthrows Isabel Perón and establishes the National Reorganization Process

Armenia 
February 25, 2021: the Armenian military calls for Prime minister Nikol Pashinyan to resign. Pashinyan accuses the military of attempting a coup d'état.

Australia 
January 26, 1808: the New South Wales Corps overthrew William Bligh, Governor of New South Wales, and installed Major George Mitchell as acting lieutenant-governor

Austria 
July 25, 1934: the Austrian Nazi Party and the Austrian SS attempted to overthrow the Fatherland Front government in the First Austrian Republic, resulting in the assassination of Chancellor Engelbert Dollfuss but ending in his succession by Kurt Schuschnigg

Azerbaijan 
June 9, 1993: Heydar Aliyev overthrows Abulfaz Elchibey in a political crisis during the First Nagorno-Karabakh War
March 13, 1995: Colonel Rovshan Javadov and his unit of OPON troops fail to seize power from President Heydar Aliyev and reinstate his predecessor Abulfaz Elchibey after Turkish President Süleyman Demirel warned Aliyev.

Bahrain 
1981 Bahraini coup d'état attempt: 73 members of the Islamic Front for the Liberation of Bahrain were arrested by the Bahraini government for attempting to orchestrating a coup. The coup was allegedly assisted by Iran, while the Iranian government has denied this claim.

Bangladesh 

August 15, 1975: Khondaker Mostaq Ahmad overthrows the BaKSAL government of Sheikh Mujibur Rahman.
November 3, 1975: Khaled Mosharraf overthrows the government set up by the August coup.
November 7, 1975: Soldiers from the Bangladesh Army overthrow and kill Khaled Mosharraf just a few days after he took power
May 30, 1981: Soldiers led by Major General Mohammad Abdul Monjur assassinate President Ziaur Rahman; they fail to seize power and are rounded up.
March 24, 1982: Hussain Muhammad Ershad overthrows President Abdus Sattar.
May 1996: Abu Saleh Mohammad Nasim attempts and fails to overthrow Abdur Rahman Biswas.
January 11, 2007: General Moeen U Ahmed pressures President Iajuddin Ahmed into declaring a state of emergency, postponing elections, and appointing a new Chief Advisor to head the caretaker government.
December 2011: Rebel army officers attempt and fail to overthrow Sheikh Hasina

Belgium

Austrian Netherlands 

 18 June 1789: The Austrian Imperial Army occupied the Great Market of Brussels, dissolved the States of Brabant and Council of Brabant and tried to arrest all its members.

United Belgian States 

 March 1790: Statist coup against the Vonckists.

Benin
October 28, 1963: Christophe Soglo overthrows Hubert Maga and the Dahomeyan Unity Party
November 27, 1965: Christophe Soglo overthrows Sourou-Migan Apithy
December 16, 1967: Maurice Kouandété overthrows Christophe Soglo
December 10, 1969: Maurice Kouandété overthrows Emile Derlin Zinsou
October 26, 1972: Mathieu Kérékou overthrows Justin Ahomadégbé-Tomêtin
January 17, 1977: French-led mercenaries attempt to overthrow Mathieu Kérékou and the People's Revolutionary Party of Benin government
March 4, 2013: Failed coup attempt by Colonel Pamphile Zomahoun against President Thomas Boni Yayi

Bolivia

April 18, 1828: Military revolt, Antonio José de Sucre is wounded in the arm and resigns
January 22, 1839: José Miguel de Velasco overthrows Andrés de Santa Cruz
June 10, 1841: Sebastián Ágreda overthrows José Miguel de Velasco
September 22, 1841:  José Ballivián overthrows Mariano Enrique Calvo
January 2, 1848: Manuel Isidoro Belzu overthrows Eusebio Guilarte and installs José Miguel de Velasco as president
December 6, 1848: Manuel Isidoro Belzu overthrows José Miguel de Velasco; failed counter-coup by Velasco
1854: Failed military revolt with notable participant Mariano Melgarejo against Manuel Isidoro Belzu
September 9, 1857: José María Linares overthrows Jorge Córdova
January 14, 1861: José María de Achá, Ruperto Fernández, and Manuel Antonio Sánchez overthrow José María Linares
December 28, 1864: Mariano Melgarejo overthrows José María de Achá
January 15, 1871: Agustín Morales overthrows Mariano Melgarejo
May 4, 1876: Hilarión Daza overthrows Tomás Frías
December 28, 1879: Hilarión Daza declared deposed in his absence, Narciso Campero proclaimed president on January 19, 1880
April 12, 1899: José Manuel Pando overthrows Severo Fernández
August 12, 1920: Bautista Saavedra overthrows José Gutiérrez
June 28, 1930: Carlos Blanco Galindo overthrows Hernando Siles Reyes' ministerial cabinet
November 27, 1934: Military revolt, Germán Busch under the orders of David Toro and Enrique Peñaranda overthrows Daniel Salamanca Urey and installs Vice President José Luis Tejada Sorzano as president
May 17, 1936: Germán Busch overthrows José Luis Tejada Sorzano and installs David Toro as president
July 13, 1937: Germán Busch overthrows David Toro
December 20, 1943: Gualberto Villarroel overthrows Enrique Peñaranda
July 21, 1946:  Enraged mob lynches Gualberto Villarroel, Néstor Guillén and then Tomás Monje installed as interim presidents
May 16, 1951:  Mamerto Urriolagoitía enacts a self-coup and installs General Hugo Ballivián as president to stop President-elect Víctor Paz Estenssoro from taking office
April 11, 1952: Hernán Siles Zuazo overthrows Hugo Ballivián and installs Víctor Paz Estenssoro as president
November 5, 1964: René Barrientos and Alfredo Ovando Candía overthrow Víctor Paz Estenssoro
September 26, 1969: Alfredo Ovando Candía overthrows Luis Adolfo Siles Salinas
October 6, 1970: Military revolt, three armed forces chiefs overthrow Alfredo Ovando Candía but rule for less than a day before Ovando loyalists under Juan José Torres take back control. Ovando agrees to entrust the presidency to Torres
August 21, 1971: Hugo Banzer overthrows Juan José Torres
November 7, 1974: Failed military revolt, Hugo Banzer bans all political activity and rules solely with military support
July 21, 1978: Juan Pereda overthrows transitional military junta
November 24, 1978: David Padilla overthrows Juan Pereda
November 1, 1979: Alberto Natusch overthrows Wálter Guevara
July 17, 1980: Luis García Meza overthrows Lidia Gueiler Tejada
June 30, 1984: Failed coup attempt by military arrests Hernán Siles Zuazo for ten hours

Bophuthatswana 
 March 11, 1994: Lucas Mangope is overthrown by mutinying Bophuthatswana Defence Force forces supported by the South African Defence Force. Bophuthatswana, a bantustan established during apartheid, is reincorporated into South Africa.

Brazil 

 November 15, 1889: Deodoro da Fonseca and the Imperial Brazilian Army overthrow Pedro II of Brazil and establish the First Brazilian Republic.
 November 3, 1891: Deodoro da Fonseca dissolves the National Congress during the Encilhamento crisis. 
 November 23, 1891: Floriano Peixoto takes power without calling for new elections, like the Constitution determined.
 November 15, 1904: Attempted military coup during the Vaccine Revolt
 November 3, 1930: Getúlio Vargas overthrows Washington Luís and prevents the inauguration of Júlio Prestes.
 November 10, 1937: Getúlio Vargas dissolves the National Congress, installing the Estado Novo dictatorship.
 October 29, 1945: A military coup d'état deposes Getúlio Vargas, installing the Second Brazilian Republic
 August 24, 1954: Possible coup d'état is averted after Getúlio Vargas commits suicide
 November 11, 1955: A coup d'état to prevent Juscelino Kubitschek from assuming the presidency fails after general Henrique Lott carries a countercoup
 February 10, 1956: The Brazilian Air Force revolts against Juscelino Kubitschek in the Jacareacanga Revolt
 December 2, 1959: Air Force military hijack a civil airplane and attempt a coup against Juscelino Kubitschek, in the Aragarças Revolt.
 August 25 – September 7, 1961: Military tries to prevent João Goulart from being sworn into presidency after resignation of Jânio Quadros. After a civil campaign and support from legalist members of the military, it is averted when a parliamentary regime is adopted, curbing presidential powers (later reverted)
 September 12, 1963: Displeased lower-ranking military personnel make a rebellion in Brasília after the Supreme Federal Court reaffirms their ineligibility for legislative posts, in the Sergeants' Revolt
 March 31, 1964: Humberto de Alencar Castelo Branco overthrows João Goulart, establishing the 21-year-long dictatorship
 August 31, 1969: The military prevents Pedro Aleixo, civilian vice-president and legal successor according to the military dictatorship recently enabled constitution, from assuming power after Costa e Silva suffers a stroke.
 January 8, 2023: Supporters of former president Jair Bolsonaro storm the National Congress, Supreme Federal Court and Planalto Palace in Brasília, in an effort to overturn the result of the 2022 Brazilian general election and claim for a military coup against President Luiz Inácio Lula da Silva.

Bulgaria
April 27, 1881: A self-coup of Knyaz Alexander of Battenberg, who dismissed the government of Petko Karavelov and suspended the Tarnovo Constitution.
August 9, 1886: An attempted dethronement of Knyaz Alexander of Battenberg.
June 9, 1923: The  overthrows Aleksandar Stamboliyski and installs coup leader Aleksandar Tsankov in power.
14–29 September 1923: Staged in September 1923 by the Bulgarian Communist Party (BCP) under Comintern pressure and attempted to overthrow Alexander Tsankov's new government of Bulgaria that had come to power with the coup d'état of 9 June. Besides its communist base, the uprising was also supported by agrarians and anarchists. The uprising's goal was the "establishment of a government of workers and peasants" in Bulgaria.
May 19, 1934: Zveno, led by Kimon Georgiev with the help of the  overthrows the coalition government led by the Democratic Party.
September 9, 1944: Zveno and the Fatherland Front, led by Kimon Georgiev, overthrows Konstantin Muraviev after the Soviet invasion of Bulgaria.
April, 1965: A plot within the Bulgarian Communist Party to overthrow Todor Zhivkov and establish an anti-Soviet Communist government was foiled.

Burkina Faso

January 3, 1966: Lieutenant Colonel Sangoulé Lamizana overthrows President Maurice Yaméogo.
February 8, 1974: 1974 Upper Voltan coup d'état
November 25, 1980: Colonel Saye Zerbo overthrows President Sangoulé Lamizana.
November 7, 1982: Major Jean-Baptiste Ouédraogo overthrows President Saye Zerbo.
February 28, 1983: Failed coup attempt against President Jean-Baptiste Ouédraogo.
August 4, 1983: Captain Blaise Compaoré overthrows President Jean-Baptiste Ouédraogo, replacing him with Captain Thomas Sankara.
October 15, 1987: Blaise Compaoré overthrows Thomas Sankara
September 18, 1989: Alleged failed coup attempt by senior officers against President Compaoré.
October 2003: 2003 Burkina Faso coup d'état attempt
October 30, 2014: Lt. Colonel Yacouba Isaac Zida overthrows current President Blaise Compaoré and briefly serves as head of state before selecting Michel Kafando as the new president. Days later, Kafando appointed Zida as acting Prime Minister.
September 17, 2015: The presidential guard headed by Gilbert Diendéré overthrows Interim President Michel Kafando, one month before elections are due in the nation. However, the coup collapses one week later and Kafando is reinstalled.
October 8, 2016: Blaise Compaore loyalists and former presidential guards failed to overthrow President Roch Marc Christian Kaboré
January 23, 2022: January 2022 Burkina Faso coup d'état
September 30, 2022: September 2022 Burkina Faso coup d'état

Burundi 
 July 8, 1966: Ntare V overthrows Mwambutsa IV
 November 28, 1966: Michel Micombero overthrows Ntare V
 November 10, 1976: Jean-Baptiste Bagaza overthrows Michel Micombero
 September 3, 1987: Pierre Buyoya overthrows Jean-Baptiste Bagaza
 July 25, 1996: Pierre Buyoya overthrows Sylvestre Ntibantunganya
 May 13–15, 2015: Failed coup d'état led by General Godefroid Niyombare against President Pierre Nkurunziza.

Cambodia 
 March 18, 1970: Lon Nol overthrows Norodom Sihanouk
 July 5, 1997: Hun Sen overthrows Norodom Ranariddh

Cameroon 
 April 6, 1984: Presidential palace guards failed to overthrow president Paul Biya.

Central African Republic 
 January 1, 1966: Jean-Bédel Bokassa overthrows David Dacko
 1974: General Martin Lingoupou attempts to overthrow Bokassa.
 1975: Attempt to overthrow Bokassa.
 1976: Groups of soldiers try to overthrow Bokassa.
 September 21, 1979: David Dacko overthrows Jean-Bédel Bokassa by French military support
 September 1, 1981: André Kolingba overthrows David Dacko
 1982: Ange-Félix Patassé, François Bozizé and Alphonse Mbaïkoua, attempt to overthrow André Kolingba.
 1996: Soldiers attempt to overthrow Patassé.
 May 27–28, 2001: Failed coup attempt against Ange-Félix Patassé
 25–8 October 2002: François Bozizé attempts to overthrow Patassé.
 March 15, 2003: François Bozizé overthrows Ange-Félix Patassé
 March 24, 2013: Michel Djotodia overthrows François Bozizé
 26 September – 3 October 2015: Failed attempt by Haroun Gaye and Eugene Ngaïkosset to overthrow Catherine Samba-Panza.
 December 2020 – January 2021: Failed coup attempt by rebel groups led by former President François Bozizé against Faustin-Archange Touadéra

Chad 
 April 13, 1975: Noël Milarew Odingar overthrows François Tombalbaye
 June 7, 1982: Hissène Habré overthrows Goukouni Oueddei
 December 1, 1990: Idriss Déby overthrows Hissène Habré
 May 16, 2004: Failed coup against President Idriss Déby
 March 14, 2006: Failed coup against President Idriss Déby
 May 1, 2013: Failed coup against Idriss Déby.

Chile 

 1781: A failed attempt to declare Chile an independent republic 
 September 18, 1810: A successful coup in favor of home rule in Chile
 April 1, 1811: A failed attempt to restore royal power in Chile
 September 4, 1811: A successful coup in favor of José Miguel Carrera
 1827: A failed attempt to destroy the opposition to the federalist system 
 June, 1828: San Fernando mutiny, of Pedro Urriola, José Antonio Vidaurre and the Maipo Battalion.
 1829: An armed conflict between conservatives and liberals over the constitutional regime
 1831: Arauco rebellion, of Pedro Barnechea and Captain Uriarte
 1832: Rebellion of Cazadores de Quechereguas Regiment, Under Cap. Eusebio Ruiz
 1833: Arteaga Conspiracy, of General Zenteno and Coronel Picarte
 1833: Cotapos revolution, of José Antonio Pérez de Cotapos
 1836: An invasion of Chiloé Island and failed attempt to depose the government
 1837: A failed attempt to depose the government that resulted in the death of Diego Portales
 1851: An armed rebellion by liberals against the conservative President Manuel Montt
 1859: A rekindling of the armed rebellion by liberals against the conservative President Manuel Montt started in 1851
 1891: An armed conflict between forces supporting National Congress and forces that supported President José Manuel Balmaceda
 1891–94: Several Balmacedist plots, Planned by Hernán Abos-Padilla, Nicanor Donoso, Diego Bahamondes, Luis Leclerc, Herminio Euth, José Domingo Briceño, Edmundo Pinto, Manuel and Emilio Rodríguez, Virgilio Talquino and Anselmo Blanlot against the new government
 1912: A failed plot against President Ramon Barros Luco. In September, Gonzalo Bulnes the appointed leader of the plot, desisted.
 1919: A failed plot by Generals Guillermo Armstrong and Manuel Moore against President Juan Luis Sanfuentes
 September 5, 1924: A successful coup against President Arturo Alessandri
 January 23, 1925: A successful coup in which Carlos Ibáñez del Campo and Marmaduke Grove overthrew Luis Altamirano to return President Arturo Alessandri to office
 September 21, 1930: A failed attempt against President Carlos Ibáñez del Campo by Marmaduke Grove
 July 26, 1931: Fall of Carlos Ibáñez del Campo, successful rebellion against Ibañez
 September, 1931: A rebellion in the Chilean Navy against Vice-president Manuel Trucco that ended with the fleet being bombed from the air.
 December 25, 1931: A failed Communist push against President Juan Esteban Montero
 June 4, 1932: A successful coup that resulted in the instauration of the Socialist Republic of Chile, in which Carlos Dávila overthrows Juan Esteban Montero
 September 27, 1932: A successful coup of General Pedro Vignola that resulted in the resignation of President Bartolomé Blanche and the return to civilian rule
 1933: A failed plot against President Arturo Alessandri. Commander-in-Chief of the Army, Pedro Vignola called "to resist the Milicia Republicana by any means"
 1935: Humberto Videla's plot, failed rebellion of NCO's
 1936: plot against Alessandri, By René Silva Espejo and Alejandro Lagos
 September 5, 1938: A failed National Socialist attempt in favor of Carlos Ibáñez that resulted in the murder of 59 young party members
 August 25, 1939: A failed attempt of Ariosto Herrera against President Pedro Aguirre Cerda
 1948: A failed plot against President Gabriel González Videla
 1954: A failed plot to allow President Carlos Ibáñez del Campo to assume dictatorial powers
 June 29, 1973: A failed coup against President Salvador Allende
 September 11, 1973:  A successful coup against President Salvador Allende (resulting in his death), in favor of Augusto Pinochet

China

Chinese Empire
 February 2, 249: Incident at Gaoping Tombs Sima Yi threw a coup against the Cao Wei regent Cao Shuang
 July 2, 626: During the Xuanwu Gate Incident, Prince Li Shimin and his close followers killed Crown Prince Li Jiancheng and Prince Li Yuanji before taking complete control of the Tang government from Emperor Gaozu.
 February 960: Coup at Chen Bridge during the Later Zhou dynasty, one of its distinguished military generals, Zhao Kuangyin, staged a coup d'état, forcing the last ruler of the dynasty, Emperor Gong, to abdicate the throne in his favour. Thus the general Zhao Kuangyin became Emperor Taizu who founded the Song Dynasty, reigning from 960 until his death in 976. 
 4 September 1323: Coup d'état at Nanpo against Gegeen Khan (alias Emperor Yingzong of Yuan, or Shidibala).
 1856: The Taiping rebellion East King Yang Xiuqing attempts to take control of the Taiping Heavenly Kingdom from Heavenly King Hong Xiuquan but he and his followers are killed
 1861: With the help of Prince Gong, Empress Dowager Cixi ousted eight regents (led by Sushun) whom the Xianfeng Emperor had appointed on his deathbed to rule for the child Tongzhi Emperor.
 September 21, 1898: Wuxu Coup: In response to the Hundred Days' Reform, Empress Dowager Cixi takes power from the Guangxu Emperor.
 February 12, 1912: Qing general Yuan Shikai, by agreement with Sun Yat-sen and his Provisional Government, Emperor Puyi to abdicate and established the Beiyang government, ending the Qing Dynasty.

Republic of China
 Late 1913 – January 1914: Yuan Shikai crackdown the Chinese National Assembly.
 December 22, 1915: Yuan Shikai launches a self-coup by establishing the Empire of China, with himself as the Emperor of China.
 June 14, 1917: Qing-loyalist general Zhang Xun overthrows Chinese President Li Yuanhong and later proclaim the restoration of the Qing Empire with Puyi as emperor.
 July 12, 1917: Brief restoration attempt was crushed by Duan Qirui troops.
 July 19, 1920: Cao Kun and Zhang Zuolin overthrow Duan Qirui.
 January 25, 1922: Wu Peifu overthrow Liang Shiyi causing First Zhili-Fengtian War.
 October 23, 1924: Feng Yuxiang overthrow Cao Kun and establish Guominjun.
 April 18, 1926: Zhang Xueliang and Wu Peifu capture the capital Beijing and then sack city leading to the collapse of Beiyang government and nearly destruction of Guominjun fraction.
 April 12, 1927: Chiang Kai-shek order to purge communists in his Kuomintang party to ensure right wing dominance in the party.
 June 2, 1928: Yan Xishan (allied with Chiang Kai-shek) overthrow Zhang Zuolin.
 April 1930: Yan Xishan expels Chiang Kai-shek's supporters from Beijing, starting the Central Plains War.
 12 December 1936 – 25 December 1936: Zhang Xueliang kidnaps Chiang Kai-shek in an attempt to seize power and establish a united Anti-Japanese front with the Communist Party against the Japanese occupation of Manchuria.

People’s Republic of China
 October 6, 1976: the Gang of Four, which allegedly tried to take over the government after the death of chairman Mao Zedong in September, are arrested

Ciskei 
 March 4, 1990: Oupa Gqozo and the Ciskei Defense Force overthrow Lennox Sebe.

Colombia 
 December, 1853: José María Melo overthrows José María Obando
 July 31, 1900: the vicepresident José Manuel Marroquín overthrows Manuel Antonio Sanclemente
 July 10, 1944: coup attempt against Alfonso López Pumarejo by some soldiers
 June 13, 1953: Gustavo Rojas Pinilla overthrows Laureano Gómez

Comoros 
 August 3, 1975: Said Mohamed Jaffar and Bob Denard overthrow Ahmed Abdallah
 May 23, 1978: Ahmed Abdallah and Bob Denard overthrow Ali Soilih
 November 26, 1989: Said Mohamed Djohar and Bob Denard overthrow Ahmed Abdallah
 September 28, 1995: Bob Denard overthrows Said Mohamed Djohar for 7 days. (see Operation Azalee)
 April 30, 1999: Azali Assoumani overthrows Tadjidine Ben Said Massounde
 April 20, 2013 A failed coup against President Ikililou Dhoinine

Congo, Democratic Republic of the 
 September 14, 1960: Joseph-Désiré Mobutu (later Mobutu Sese Seko) overthrows Patrice Lumumba
 November 25, 1965: Joseph-Désiré Mobutu (later Mobutu Sese Seko) overthrows Joseph Kasa-Vubu
 May 16, 1997: Laurent-Désiré Kabila overthrows Mobutu Sese Seko, leading to the First Congo War

Congo, Republic of the 
 August 15, 1963: Alphonse Massamba-Débat overthrows Fulbert Youlou
 September 4, 1968: Marien Ngouabi overthrows Alphonse Massamba-Débat
 February 8, 1979: Denis Sassou Nguesso overthrows Joachim Yhombi-Opango
 October 25, 1997: Denis Sassou Nguesso overthrows Pascal Lissouba

Costa Rica 
 April 27, 1870: Bruno Carranza overthrows Jesús Jiménez Zamora
 July 30, 1876: Vicente Herrera Zeledón overthrows Aniceto Esquivel Sáenz
 January 27, 1917: Federico Tinoco Granados overthrows Alfredo González Flores
April 24, 1948: José Figueres Ferrer overthrows Teodoro Picado Michalski
January, 1955: Failed attempt to overthrow Jose Figueres Ferrer

Cuba 
 September 3, 1933: Fulgencio Batista ousts Carlos Manuel de Céspedes y Quesada. 
 March 10, 1952: Batista overthrows Carlos Prío Socarrás
 Jan 1, 1959: Fidel Castro and his communist revolutionaries overthrow Fulgencio Batista government.

Curaçao 
 December 1, 1796: Johann Lauffer overthrows Jan Jacob Beaujon as governor.

Cyprus 
 1972–1973: Three bishops of the Greek Orthodox Church attempt to overthrow Archbishop Makarios III as President of Cyprus
 July 15, 1974: Nikos Sampson, with support from EOKA B and the National Guard, overthrows Makarios III

Czechoslovakia 
 1926–28 Gajda Affair: Rumored coup plots by Radola Gajda and the Czechoslovak Army against President Tomáš Garrigue Masaryk's government.
February 25, 1948: the Communist Party of Czechoslovakia under Klement Gottwald eliminates all democratic elements from power.

Denmark 
 1660 by Frederick III of Denmark declares a state of emergency after the Dano-Swedish War to forcibly implement an absolute hereditary monarchy. 
 1772; Juliana Maria of Brunswick-Wolfenbüttel; her advisor Ove Høegh-Guldberg; and her son Hereditary Prince Frederick threw a palace coup against Queen Caroline Matilda of Great Britain and her lover Johann Friedrich Struensee, who had come to dominate the Danish court due to the mental illness of King Christian VII
 1784; Crown Prince Frederick of Denmark overthrew Juliana Maria's clique

Dominica 
April 27, 1981; Failed coup attempt by American and Canadian Neo-Nazi white supremacist and Ku Klux Klan leaders James Alexander McQuirter and Don Black to overthrow Prime Minister Eugenia Charles and restore Prime Minister Patrick John

Dominican Republic 
 May 30, 1849: Pedro Santana overthrows Manuel Jiménes
 June 13, 1858: José Desiderio Valverde overthrows Buenaventura Báez
 March 3, 1930: Rafael Trujillo and Rafael Estrella Ureña overthrows Horacio Vásquez
 September 25, 1963: Elías Wessin y Wessin overthrows Juan Bosch, leading to the Dominican Civil War

Ecuador 
 1925 by Luis Telmo Paz y Miño
 1935 by Federico Páez
 1963 by Ramón Castro Jijón
 1972 by Guillermo Rodríguez
 1975 failed attempt by General Raúl González Alvear
 2000 by Lucio Gutiérrez
2010 by the National Police of Ecuador

Egypt 
 1879: Nationalist Revolution. Beginning of the British Occupation of Egypt. 
1919: Attempt to stop the British Occupation of Egypt, The Kingdom of Egypt is Established and Recognised as an Independent State. 
1952: Muhammad Naguib and the Free Officers Movement overthrows Farouk of Egypt, ending the Kingdom of Egypt. 
 February 27, 1954: Gamal Abdel Nasser overthrows Muhammad Naguib
 December, 1957: Prince Muhammad Abdel Moneim tries to overthrow Nasser and restore the monarchy.
2011: Hosni Mubarak Overthrown
2013: Mohamed Morsi Overthrown by General Abdel Fattah El Sisi

El Salvador 
 December 2, 1931 by Maximiliano Hernández Martínez
 April 2, 1944: Failed coup by the army.
 October 20, 1944 by Osmín Aguirre y Salinas
 December 14, 1948 by Manuel de Jesús Córdova
 October 26, 1960: A bloodless coup overthrows President José María Lemus
 January 25, 1961: A coup overthrows the junta established just a few months before.
 March 25–26, 1972: Failed coup by the army.
 October 15, 1979: A coup d'état brought the Revolutionary Government Junta of El Salvador to power.

England 
 1603: Main Plot: Alleged Spanish-funded plot by courtiers led by Henry Brooke, 11th Baron Cobham to overthrow King James I and replace him with his cousin Lady Arbella Stuart.
5 November 1605: Gunpowder Plot: Failed plot by a group of provincial English Catholics, including Guy Fawkes, who attempted to kill King James I and much of the Protestant aristocracy by blowing up the Houses of Parliament during the State Opening of Parliament.
 1641: Army Plots: alleged and real Royalist plans by King Charles I to suppress the English Parliament before the First English Civil War; exposed by Parliamentarians such as John Pym
 1648: Pride's Purge: Parliamentarian troops under Colonel Thomas Pride purge the Long Parliament of those opposed to trying King Charles I for treason after the English Civil War, turning it into the republican Rump Parliament and leading directly to the abolition of the monarchy.
 20 April 1653: Dissolution of the Rump Parliament: Oliver Cromwell, with forty musketeers under the command of Charles Worsley, entered the House of Commons and forcibly dissolved the Rump Parliament leading to Cromwell becoming Lord Protector and instigating military rule.
 1654: Gerard's conspiracy: abortive Royalist conspiracy to assassinate Lord Protector Oliver Cromwell
 1688–1689: The Glorious Revolution: William III of Orange invades England at the invitation of the country's powerful Protestants, deposing the Catholic James II of England.

Equatorial Guinea 

 August 3, 1979: Teodoro Obiang Nguema Mbasogo overthrows Francisco Macías Nguema
 March 7, 2004: A coup attempt is stopped before the plotters can arrive in country

Estonia 
 December 1, 1924: failed Communist coup attempt
 March 12, 1934: Konstantin Päts (self coup) and established an authoritarian rule.

Ethiopia 
 1910: Ras Tessema Nadew and Fitawrawi Habte Giyorgis against Empress Taytu, regent of the incapacitated Emperor Menelik II of Ethiopia
 1916: a group of aristocrats, including Fitawrawi Habte Giyorgis and Ras Tafari Makonnen, against Emperor Iyasu V.
 December 13, 1960: A group failed to overthrow Emperor Haile Selassie during a state visit.
 September 12, 1974: Aman Mikael Andom overthrows Emperor Haile Selassie I, establishing the Derg
 November 17, 1974: Tafari Benti overthrows Aman Mikael Andom
 February 3, 1977: Mengistu Haile Mariam overthrows Tafari Benti
 June 22, 2019: Failed coup against the regional government in Amhara Region; resulted in the death of several prominent Ethiopian civil and military officials

Fiji 
 May 14, 1987: Sitiveni Rabuka overthrows Prime Minister Timoci Bavadra
 September 28, 1987: Sitiveni Rabuka overthrows Governor General Ratu Sir Penaia Ganilau and Queen Elizabeth II. Republic is proclaimed 
 May 19, 2000: George Speight overthrows Mahendra Chaudhry
 December 5, 2006: Frank Bainimarama overthrows Laisenia Qarase

Finland 
 27 January 1918: The radical left wing Labour Movement failed to overthrow the Finnish Senate.
 February 27 – March 6, 1932: The radical nationalist Lapua Movement failed to overthrow the Finnish government.
Pro-Soviet Finnish Communist  plot to overthrow the Finnish government in 1948 (cancelled).

France

Ancien Régime 
 1567: Failed plot by Louis, Prince of Condé to kidnap King Charles IX, causing the Second French War of Religion

Revolutionary France and First Republic
 10 August 1792: The Paris Commune rallied Republican fédérés and National Guard troops to storm the Tuileries Palace, effectively deposing the French monarchy and imprisoning King Louis XVI
 31 May – 2 June 1793: Montagnard-aligned sans-culottes arrest all leading Girondin ministers and deputies and execute them
 26–28 July 1794: A conspiracy of anti-Robespierrist Montagnards form an alliance to have de facto dictator Robespierre and his associates arrested and executed; they escape but are arrested again and executed
 1 April 1795: Unarmed citizens occupied the National Convention, but were driven out by the National Guard without bloodshed
 5 October 1795: A royalist attempt to seize power in Paris during the Vendée rebellion is crushed by the French Revolutionary Army under the command of Napoleon Bonaparte
 4 September 1797: The French Directory, with the support of the military, deposes the royalists
 May 1796: Failed radical attempt to overthrow the Directory led by Gracchus Babeuf
 11 May 1798: The French Directory dismisses 106 Jacobin deputies from the Council of Five Hundred. 
 18 June 1799: The Councils obtain the removal of three out of the five members of the French Directory through military pressure, leaving Emmanuel Joseph Sieyès as the dominant member of the French government. 
 9 November 1799: Napoleon Bonaparte overthrows the French Directory and installs the French Consulate
 February 1804: A foiled royalist plot to overthrow the Napoleonic Consulate

First Empire
 23 October 1812: General Claude François de Malet fails to remove Napoleon from power while he was away on the Russian Campaign

Second Republic
 2 December 1851: Louis-Napoléon Bonaparte, then president of France, dissolves the National Assembly and becomes the sole ruler of the country. In the following year, he would restore the French Empire after a referendum.

Third Republic
 23 February 1899: Paul Déroulède attempts to overthrow the French Third Republic

Fourth Republic
 13 May 1958: A partial coup d'état led by Pierre Lagaillarde, after which Charles de Gaulle is brought back to power and established the French Fifth Republic

Fifth Republic
 21–26 April 1961: A failed coup d'état against President Charles de Gaulle intended to prevent a withdrawal from French Algeria
 2021: under the coordination of a conspirationist leader, around 300 followers (including policemen and military forces) aimed to overthrow Emmanuel Macron

Gabon 
 February 17–18, 1964: A group of Gabonese officers overthrows President Leon Mba
 January 7, 2019: Gabonese soldiers seizing the national radio in an attempted coup against Ali Bongo Ondimba.

The Gambia 
 July 22, 1994: Yahya Jammeh overthrows Dawda Jawara
 December 30, 2014: a failed coup against Yahya Jammeh led by Former head of the presidential guards Lamin Sanneh
 December 20, 2022: 2022 Gambian coup d'état attempt - A few soldiers allegedly tried to overthrow the government of President Adama Barrow.

Georgia 
 3 May 1920: 1920 Georgian coup attempt, a failed Bolshevik coup against the Democratic Republic of Georgia.
 Jan 6, 1992: Tengiz Kitovani and Jaba Ioseliani overthrow Zviad Gamsakhurdia

Germany

Weimar Republic 
 January 1919: The Spartacus League attempts to overthrow the Social Democratic-dominated Council of People's Deputies; suppressed by the Reichswehr and the Freikorps. 
 March 1920: Various Freikorps led by Wolfgang Kapp and Walther von Lüttwitz attempt to overthrow Weimar Republic; seize control of Berlin but are suppressed with a general strike. 
 November 8, 1923: failed attempt by Nazi Party leader Adolf Hitler with Erich Ludendorff to seize control of Bavaria and overthrow Gustav Ritter von Kahr's state government in Munich; suppressed by the Reichswehr and the police.

Third Reich 

 March 23, 1933: By the Enabling Act of 1933, the Chancellor Adolf Hitler assumes full powers in a self-coup.
 1938: Oster conspiracy: Plan by Hans Oster and other high-ranking members of the Wehrmacht to overthrow the Nazi dictatorship and crown Prince William of Prussia as Emperor of a revived Hohenzollern Dynasty if Germany went to war with Czechoslovakia over the Sudetenland; never carried out due to the Munich Agreement
 July 20, 1944: Members of the German resistance led by Claus von Stauffenberg attempted to assassinate Adolf Hitler and seize control from the Nazi Party; bombed the Wolf's Lair in Rastenburg, East Prussia, but failed to kill Hitler.

Federal Republic 
 December 7, 2022: Police arrested 25 people for allegedly planning a coup. Part of the alleged plot included storming the Bundestag, the German parliament building.

Ghana 
 February 24, 1966: Joseph Arthur Ankrah overthrows Kwame Nkrumah
 April 17, 1967: Failed military coup
 January 13, 1972: Ignatius Kutu Acheampong overthrows Kofi Abrefa Busia
 July 5, 1978: Fred Akuffo overthrows Ignatius Kutu Acheampong
 June 4, 1979: Jerry John Rawlings overthrows Fred Akuffo
 December 31, 1981: Jerry John Rawlings overthrows Hilla Limann

Greece 

 1831: A naval mutiny organized by Andreas Miaoulis against the government of Ioannis Kapodistrias, leading to the burning of the fleet on 13 August in the port of Poros
 1831: after the assassination of Kapodistrias, a revolt against his brother Augustinos forced the Senate to take refuge in Astros
 3 September 1843: King Otto was forced to grant Greece its first Constitution
 23 October 1862: leading to the departure of King Otto and his queen, first step towards the 1862 Greek head of state referendum which resulted in Prince William of Denmark becoming George I, the King of the Hellenes
 15 August 1909: The Goudi coup was staged against the government of Dimitrios Rallis, which brought Eleftherios Venizelos to the Greek political scene
 17 August 1916: The National Defence coup d'état of Venizelos supporters in Thessaloniki led to the establishment of the Provisional Government of National Defence
 11 September 1922: Led by Colonels Nikolaos Plastiras and Stylianos Gonatas and Commander Dimitrios Phokas, culminating in the abdication of King Constantine I
 11 October 1923: Leonardopoulos–Gargalidis coup d'état attempt led by the royalist officers
 25 June 1925: Greek coup d'état brought General Theodoros Pangalos to power
 1926 Greek coup d'état on 22 August 1926, overthrow of General Pangalos by General Georgios Kondylis
 1933 Greek coup d'état attempt on 6 March 1933, led by republican General Nikolaos Plastiras
 1935 Greek coup d'état attempt on 1 March 1935, led by General Plastiras and Venizelos
 1935 Greek coup d'état on 10 October 1935, led by General Kondylis, signalling the end of the Second Hellenic Republic and leading to the restoration of King George II to the throne, according to a referendum
 4 August 1936: General Ioannis Metaxas established the 4th of August Regime
 28 July 1938: Greek coup d'état attempt rebellion in Crete against the 4th of August Regime
 31 May 1951: Attempted coup d'état of a group of right-wing officers named Sacred Link of Greek Officers (IDEA)
 21 April 1967: Greek coup d'état, performed by a group of right-wing army officers led by Brigadier General Stylianos Pattakos and Colonels Georgios Papadopoulos and Nikolaos Makarezos, established the Regime of the Colonels
 13 December 1967: Greek counter-coup attempt led by King Constantine II against the Regime of the Colonels. The failure of the counter-coup forced the King to leave Greece definitively
 23 May 1973: The Velos mutiny against the Regime of the Colonels. The crew of the destroyer HNS Velos (D-16), under the command of Nikolaos Pappas, demanded political asylum in Italy, while the rest of the mutiny in Greek territory is suppressed
 25 November 1973: The aftermath of the Athens Polytechnic uprising. The coup resulted in overthrow of Colonel Papadopoulos by hardliners around General Dimitrios Ioannidis
 24 February 1975: Pyjamas coup attempt by certain officers to overthrow the government of Konstantinos Karamanlis

Grenada 
 March 13, 1979: Maurice Bishop overthrows Eric Gairy
 October 14, 1983: Bernard Coard overthrows Maurice Bishop
 October 19, 1983: Hudson Austin overthrows Bernard Coard

Guam 
 1898 by José Sisto overthrows Francisco Portusach Martínez as Governor of Guam after Martinez received the position following the American capture of Guam during the Spanish-American War 
 1898 by Venancio Roberto and several islanders overthrew José Sisto, who was eventually reappointed to his old position by the U.S. federal government

Guatemala 
June 27, 1954: Carlos Castillo Armas overthrows Jacobo Árbenz Guzmán's Revolutionary Action Party government; assisted by the CIA in Operation PBSUCCESS.
 March 31, 1963 under Enrique Peralta Azurdia
 March 23, 1982 under Efraín Ríos Montt

Guinea 
 April 3, 1984: Lansana Conté overthrows Louis Lansana Beavogui
 December 24, 2008: Moussa Dadis Camara overthrows Aboubacar Somparé in what became known as the Christmas Coup. 
 September 5, 2021: Mamady Doumbouya overthrows Alpha Condé

Guinea-Bissau 
 November 14, 1980: João Bernardo Vieira overthrows Luís Cabral
 May 7, 1999: Ansumane Mané overthrows João Bernardo Vieira
 September 14, 2003: Veríssimo Correia Seabra overthrows Kumba Ialá
 April 12, 2012: Army overthrows the government.
 February 1, 2022: Failed attempt to overthrow the government

Haiti 
 October 17, 1806: Henri Christophe and Alexandre Pétion overthrow Emperor Jacques I
 Feb 13, 1843: Charles Rivière-Hérard overthrows Jean-Pierre Boyer
 May 3, 1844: Philippe Guerrier overthrows Charles Rivière-Hérard
 March 24, 1846: Jean-Baptiste Riché overthrows Jean-Louis Pierrot
 January 15, 1859: Fabre Geffrard overthrows Emperor Faustin I
 August 26, 1867: Sylvain Salnave overthrows Fabre Geffrard
 December 27, 1869: Nissage Saget overthrows Sylvain Salnave
 April 16, 1876: Pierre Théoma Boisrond-Canal overthrows Michel Domingue
 October 19, 1888: François Denys Légitime overthrows Lysius Salomon
 October 17, 1889: Florvil Hyppolite overthrows François Denys Légitime
 December 21, 1902: Pierre Nord Alexis overthrows Pierre Théoma Boisrond-Canal
 December 2, 1908: François C. Antoine Simon overthrows Pierre Nord Alexis
 August 3, 1911: Cincinnatus Leconte overthrows Antoine Simon
 January, 1914: Oreste Zamor overthrows Michel Oreste
 November 7, 1914: Joseph Davilmar Théodore overthrows Oreste Zamor
 February 25, 1915: Vilbrun Guillaume Sam overthrows Joseph Davilmar Théodore
 July 28, 1915: Mulatto uprising overthrows and kills Vilbrun Guillaume Sam
 January 11, 1946: Military junta overthrows Élie Lescot
 May 10, 1950: Paul Eugène Magloire against Dumarsais Estimé
 April 4, 1957: Leon Cantave overthrows Franck Sylvain
 June 14, 1957: Antonio Thrasybule Kébreau overthrows Daniel Fignolé
 July 28–29, 1958: Pasquet, Dominique, Perpignan failed attempt Francois Duvalier
 February 6, 1986: Jean Claude Duvalier goes into exile. He is replaced by the National Governing Council
June 20, 1988: Henri Namphy overthrows Leslie Manigat
 September 17, 1988: Prosper Avril overthrows Henri Namphy
 September 30, 1991: Raoul Cédras overthrows Jean-Bertrand Aristide
 5–29 February 2004: ousted President Jean-Bertrand Aristide during his second term

Hawaii 
 January 17, 1893: The Overthrow of the Hawaiian Kingdom. A coup d'état against Queen Liliʻuokalani on the island of Oahu by subjects of the Hawaiian Kingdom, United States citizens, and foreign residents residing in Honolulu. A majority of the insurgents were foreigners. They prevailed upon American minister John L. Stevens to call in the U.S. Marines to protect United States interests, an action that effectively buttressed the rebellion. The revolutionaries established the Republic of Hawaii, but their ultimate goal was the annexation of the islands to the United States, which occurred in 1898.

Honduras 
 May 10, 1827: José Justo Milla overthrows Dionisio de Herrera
 October 21, 1956 
 October 3, 1963 under Oswaldo López Arellano
 December 4, 1972 under Oswaldo López Arellano
 April 22, 1975 under Juan Alberto Melgar Castro
 August 7, 1978 under Policarpo Paz García
 June 28, 2009

Hungary 
 August 7, 1919: István Friedrich overthrows the MSZDP government of Gyula Peidl
 October 15–16, 1944: Ferenc Szálasi and the Arrow Cross Party, supported by the Wehrmacht and the Waffen-SS, overthrow Regent Miklós Horthy to prevent him from signing an armistice with the Allied Powers. 
May 28–31, 1947: Mátyás Rákosi and the Hungarian Communist Party overthrow Ferenc Nagy's government by arresting members of the National Assembly. 
November 4, 1956: the Soviet Army invades Hungary and overthrows Imre Nagy, replacing him with János Kádár.

Indonesia 
 1946 Indonesian coup attempt
 1950 Indonesian Coup.
 1959 Indonesian constitutional coup
 Sep 30, 1965: A failed coup attempt that is blamed to the Communist Party of Indonesia.
 March 11, 1966: Suharto overthrows Sukarno (see Transition to the New Order)

Iran

Achaemenid Empire 
 552 BC: Persian Revolt: Cyrus the Great led the Persis to declare independence from and then conquer the Median Empire, establishing the Achaemenid Empire. 
522 BC: Darius I's revolt against Bardiya
338 BC: Assassination of Artaxerxes III and his family by Bagoas. Artaxerxes IV becomes the new King of Kings.
336 BC: Bagoas kills Artaxerxes IV by poison. Rise of Darius III to the throne.

Sassanid Empire 
309: Assassination of Adur Narseh by the nobles; His infant brother, Shapur II, becomes the new King of Kings.
420: Assassination and deposition of Yazdegerd I by the nobles.
488: Deposition of Balash by Sukhra, in favor of the shah's nephew, Kavad I.
496: The nobles depose Kavad I and install Jamasp as the new shah of shahs of Iran and Aniran.
590: Coup d'état by Vistahm and Vinduyih against Hormizd IV, in favor of his son, Khosrow II.
590: General Bahram Chobin revolts against the Sassanian government and captures Ctesiphon. Khosrow II flees to Constantinople.
628: Overthrow of Khosrow II by his son Kavad II.
630: Siege of Ctesiphon by the military commander Shahrbaraz. Execution of king Ardashir III.
631: Rostam Farrokhzad captures Ctesiphon, kills Azarmidokht and installs Boran as the queen of queens of Iran and Aniran.

Safavid Empire 
1732: Nader Shah overthrows Tahmasp II
1733: Governor of the Kuhgiluyeh's rebellion against Safavid Empire
1736: Deposition of Abbas III, the nominal ruler of Iran, by Nader Shah. The official end of the Safavid dynasty of Iran.

Afsharid dynasty 
1744: Beylerbey of Fars province's rebellion against Nader Shah
 1747: Assassination of Nader Shah in support of Adil Shah.
 1748: Ebrahim Afshar (brother of Adil Shah) defeated and blinded him and took the throne.
 1748: Assassination of Ebrahim Afshar by command of Shahrukh Afshar

Qajar Dynasty 
 1798: Assassination of Agha Mohammad Khan Qajar in support of Sadiq Khan Shaqaqi
 1908: Bombardment of the Majlis by Vladimir Liakhov in support of Mohammad Ali Shah Qajar.

Pahlavi Iran 
 1921: Coup d'état by Reza Khan Mirpanj (later Reza Shah Pahlavi) and Zia'eddin Tabatabaee during the reign of Ahmad Shah Qajar.
 1953: Coup d'état against Prime Minister Mohammed Mossadegh in support of Mohammad Reza Pahlavi; sponsored by the CIA and MI6 in retaliation for the nationalization of Anglo-Iranian Oil.

Islamic Republic of Iran 
 1980: Failed coup d'état by a group of Iranian Armed Forces officers against the newly established Islamic regime.

Iraq 
 October 20, 1936: Bakr Sidqi overthrows Yasin al-Hashimi
 April 1, 1941: Rashid Ali al-Gaylani overthrows 'Abd al-Ilah with the support of the Axis Powers, leading to the Anglo-Iraqi War
 July 14, 1958: Abdul Karim Qassim against King Faisal II, ending the Hashemite monarchy in Iraq. 
 February 8, 1963: Abdul Salam Arif and Ahmed Hassan al-Bakr overthrow Abdul Karim Qassim
 November 11, 1963: Pro-Nasserist officers of the Iraqi Armed Forces oust the Ba'ath Party from government
 July 17, 1968: Ahmed Hassan al-Bakr overthrows Abdul Rahman Arif, establishing the Ba'athist dictatorship.

Italy 
 1922 March on Rome: Fascist coup d'état: Benito Mussolini and his National Fascist Party's Blackshirt militias attempt to overthrow Prime Minister Luigi Facta with an insurrection in Rome; successful when King Victor Emmanuel III refused to allow Facta to declare a state of martial law
 1943: The 24 July coup to remove Fascist dictator Benito Mussolini as Prime Minister of the Kingdom of Italy and replace him with Marshal Pietro Badoglio; Count Dino Grandi and the Grand Council of Fascism voted overwhelmingly to ask King Victor Emmanuel to resume his full constitutional powers and, on the following day, the King summoned Mussolini to his palace and dismissed him.
 1964: Alleged Coup attempted by military groups (see Piano Solo)
 1970 Golpe Borghese: Coup attempt by neo-fascist groups led by Junio Valerio Borghese, a former Italian Royal Navy commander of World War II; failed after the CIA and NATO refused to support it

Ivory Coast 
 December 24, 1999: Robert Guéï overthrows Henri Konan Bédie

Japan 
 Lunar August, 456 AD: Historical texts state that Mayuwa no Ōkimi (:ja:眉輪王) assassinated reigning Ōkimi Emperor Ankō (安康天皇)  over the alleged killing of his father.  According to Nihonshiki, the influential Ōomi Katsuragi no Tsubura was also killed by arson, whereas the Kojiki says he killed himself.  This potentially could have been a coup attempt as the two most senior statesmen were targeted and eliminated, nevertheless the plotter is not indicated to have wanted to assume the throne, instead Emperor Yuryaku ascended 3 months later.
 479 AD – Prince Hoshikawa Rebellion: Failed attempt by Prince Hoshikawa to gain the throne
 498 AD: Ōomi Heguri no Matori briefly takes over Yamato Japan's government in a briefly successful coup upon the death of Emperor Ninken, before being defeated and killed by Otomo no Kanamura, who raised Emperor Buretsu to the throne.
Over a century later, in 632 A.D. the title Ōkimi was posthumously reassigned to the term Tenno. This term is currently equated with Emperor.
 645 AD: Soga no Iruka was assassinated in a successful coup, with one of the coup plotters becoming the next Emperor. (Taika Reform)
 764 AD: Failed coup by Fujiwara no Nakamaro to overthrow Retired Empress Kōken and the monk Dōkyō.
 1156: Emperor Go-Shirakawa defeats his rival Jōkō Emperor Sutoku.
 1160: The Minamoto clan took up arms against the Taira clan, the Taira clan emerges victorious.
 1184: Amidst the Genpei War, Kiso Yoshinaka ambushes Hōjūjidono, confining Emperor Go-Toba and Cloistered Emperor Go-Shirakawa.
 1551:  Sue Takafusa (later known as Sue Harukata) launches a rebellion against Ōuchi Yoshitaka, hegemon daimyō of western Japan, leading the latter to commit seppuku.
 1864–65: The Mito Rebellion of Takeda Kōunsai; rebellion in the Mito Domain in support of the sonnō jōi policy
 1866–68: The Meiji Restoration and modernization revolution in Japan. Samurai uprising leads to overthrow of the Tokugawa Shogunate and establishment of "modern" parliamentary, Western-style system under the Meiji era.
 March 1931: An aborted coup by the Sakurakai to overthrow Prime Minister Osachi Hamaguchi and form a new government led by Army Minister Kazushige Ugaki.
 October 21, 1931: An aborted coup also by the Sakurakai
 May 15, 1932: A failed coup by members of the Imperial Japanese Navy resulting in the assassination of Prime Minister Inukai Tsuyoshi
 November 1934: A failed coup by members of the Imperial Japanese Army to achieve a Shōwa Restoration.
 February 26, 1936: A failed coup by the Imperial Way Faction in the Imperial Japanese Army against Prime Minister Keisuke Okada's government. 
 August 14–15, 1945: A failed coup against the Emperor Hirohito by members of the Japanese War Ministry and the Imperial Guard opposed to surrendering to the Allied Powers at the end of World War II; failed after failing to convince the Imperial Japanese Army General Staff and the Eastern District Army to join
 August 24, 1945: A failed coup by dissidents opposed to surrender led by Isao Okazaki in Matsue. 
 December 12, 1961: Sanyuu Incident, an aborted coup by retired right wing members of the Imperial Japanese Army
 November 25, 1970: An aborted coup by author Yukio Mishima, who attempted to convince the Japan Self-Defense Forces to overturn the 1947 Constitution.

Jordan 
 1970: Failed Palestine Liberation Organization coup attempt against King Hussein; King Hussein retaliated with Black September conflict driving the PLO to Lebanon.
 2021: Failed coup attempt by Prince Hamzah bin Hussein to overthrow his half-brother, King Abdullah II

Kenya 
 1st August 1982: attempted coup by Kenya Air Force personnel to overthrow the Daniel arap Moi government; captured Eastleigh Air Base and parts of Nairobi before collapsing

Korea, North 

 ca 1967, Kapsan Faction Incident: Attempt by faction of former anti-Japanese guerrillas led by Pak Kum-chol to overthrow Kim Il-sung, end the cult of personality, and introduce economic reforms. Led to a crackdown and purges in the Korean Workers' Party, as well as the implementation of the Ten Principles for the Establishment of a Monolithic Ideological System.

Korea, South 
 May 16, 1961: Park Chung Hee overthrew the Second Republic of Korea led by Yun Po-seon and replaced it with the Supreme Council for National Reconstruction
 October 17, 1972: President Park Chung Hee lead a coup to restore total presidential authority after his party underperformed in elections, creating the Fourth Republic of Korea.
 December 12, 1979: Major General Chun Doo-hwan of the Defense Security Command arrested Republic of Korea Army Chief of Staff Jeong Seung-hwa and his allies, creating the Fifth Republic of Korea.
 May 17, 1980: General Chun Doo-Hwan extended martial law, banned political activities and forced universities to close.

Laos 
 25 December 1959: Coup by Captain Kong Le established General Phoumi Nosavan in charge
 9 August 1960: Captain Kong Le overthrew General Phoumi
 16 December 1960: General Phoumi won counter-coup in Battle of Vientiane
 18 April 1964: Police General Siho Lamphouthacoul seized power for five days
 4 August 1964: General Phoumi's attempt fails
 31 January 1965: Colonel Bounleut Saycocie's and General Phoumi's independent attempts both fail
 1966 Laotian coup: General Thao Ma's coup by air strike fails
 1973 Laotian coup: General Thao Ma's coup via air strike fails
 2007 Laotian coup failed coup by General Vang Pao

Latvia 
 May 15, 1934: Kārlis Ulmanis dissolved the Saeima (Parliament) and established an authoritarian rule.

Lebanon 

 December 31, 1961: A failed coup attempt conducted by the Syrian Socialist Nationalist Party.

Lesotho 
 January 18, 1986: Justin Metsing Lekhanya overthrows Leabua Jonathan
 November 12, 1990: Justin Metsing Lekhanya overthrows King Moshoeshoe II of Lesotho
 May 2, 1991: Elias Phisoana Ramaema overthrows Justin Metsing Lekhanya
 August 30, 2014: A failed coup attempt

Liberia 
 October 26, 1871: President Edward James Roye is deposed by the people of Monrovia.
 April 12, 1980: Master Sergeant Samuel K. Doe overthrows President William R. Tolbert, Jr.
 September 9, 1990: Prince Johnson overthrows President Samuel K. Doe

Libya 
 September 1, 1969: Muammar al-Gaddafi overthrows King Idris I of Libya and establishes a republic.
 April 17, 2013: an attempt Libyan coup against Prime Minister Ali Zeidan by Muammar Gaddafi loyalists.
 October 10, 2013: a second attempt Libyan coup led by Abdel-Moneim al-Hour against Prime Minister Ali Zeidan.
 April and October 2014: a failed coups against Prime Minister Ali Zeidan in first coup and Prime Minister Abdullah al-Thani in second coup by Maj. Gen.Khalifa Haftar.
 14 October 2016: a failed coup against Prime Minister Fayez al-Sarraj by ex-Prime Minister Khalifa al-Ghawil.

Lithuania 
There are estimated to be over 10 unsuccessful coups during the period of 1919–1940 in Lithuania.

 1919 Polish coup d'état attempt in Lithuania
 December 17, 1926, overthrowing President Kazys Grinius and Antanas Smetona becoming the head of state.
 September 9, 1927, a failed attempt to overthrow Lithuanian Nationalist Union and to re-establish previous Govt.
 June 6–7, 1934 failed coup d'état led by fascist Iron Wolf

Madagascar

Kingdom of Madagascar (Imerina)
 May 12, 1863, successful: Prime Minister Rainivoninahitriniony deposes king Radama II, who is (supposedly) killed and succeeded by his wife queen Rasoherina
 March 27, 1868, failed: an attempted coup to reinstate Rainivoninahitriniony as prime minister

Republic of Madagascar
 October 11, 1972: Gabriel Ramanantsoa overthrows Philibert Tsiranana
 February 5, 1975: Richard Ratsimandrava overthrows Gabriel Ramanantsoa
 March 17, 2009: Andry Rajoelina overthrows Marc Ravalomanana (see 2009 Malagasy political crisis)

Maldives 
In 1980 former president Nassir, along with his brother in law Ahmed Naseem, the health minister Mohammed Mustafa Hussain and a leading businessman Khua Mohammed Yusuf, allegedly hired a group of nine former members of Britain's elite Special Air Service commandos and sent them to assassinate president Gayoom. The mercenaries used Sri Lanka as their base and carried out several reconnaissance trips. They were also provided arms to carry out their mission and promised an inducement of $60,000 each. The attempt was called off by the SAS members because they started having second thoughts.
1988 Maldives coup d'état attempt: Abdullah Luthufi assisted by PLOTE stages a coup to overthrow the government of Maumoon Abdul Gayoom. They seize control of the capital until Indian military forces retake the city from the rebels.

Mali 
 November 19, 1968: Moussa Traoré overthrows Modibo Keïta
 March 26, 1991: Amadou Toumani Touré overthrows Moussa Traoré
 March 22, 2012: Military overthrows Amadou Toumani Touré
 August 18, 2020: Military overthrows Ibrahim Boubacar Keïta
 2021 Malian coup d'état: Military overthrows Bah N'daw
 2022 Malian coup d'état attempt: Malian Military Junta claims to have stopped a coup attempt lead by an "unnamed NATO country"

Mauritania 
 July 10, 1978: Mustafa Ould Salek overthrows Moktar Ould Daddah
 April 6, 1979: Ahmad Ould Bouceif and Mohamed Khouna Ould Haidalla overthrow Mustafa Ould Salek
 January 4, 1980: Mohamed Khouna Ould Haidalla overthrows Mohamed Mahmoud Ould Louly
 December 12, 1984: Maaouya Ould Sid'Ahmed Taya overthrows Mohamed Khouna Ould Haidalla
 August 3, 2005: Ely Ould Mohamed Vall overthrows Maaouya Ould Sid'Ahmed Taya
 August 6, 2008: Mohamed Ould Abdel Aziz overthrows Sidi Ould Cheikh Abdallahi

Mexico 
 1799: Conspiracy of the Machetes in New Spain: plot by Criollo civil servants to overthrow the Spanish Empire and establish an independent republic; regarded as a precursor to the War of Mexican Independence
 1829 by Anastasio Bustamante against Vicente Guerrero
 1845 by Mariano Paredes against José Joaquín de Herrera
 1876 by Porfirio Díaz against Sebastián Lerdo de Tejada
 1911: Francisco I. Madero against Porfirio Díaz (and Francisco León de la Barra)
 1913 by Victoriano Huerta (and Pedro Lascuráin) against Francisco I. Madero
 1920 by Adolfo de la Huerta against Venustiano Carranza

Montenegro 
 October 2016: attempted by opposition and Russian agents against the government of Milo Đukanović on the day of parliamentary election

Morocco 
 July 10, 1971 failed coup attempt by M'hamed Ababou and Mohamed Medbouh against Hassan II of Morocco
 August 16, 1972 failed coup  by Mohamed Oufkir against Hassan II of Morocco

Myanmar (Burma) 
 1837: King Bagyidaw was deposed by a coup led by his brother Tharrawaddy Min
 1853: King Pagan Min was deposed by a coup led by his brother Mindon Min
 In October, 1958 a split within the AFPFL threatened to provoke a coup from field officers. In order to settle the situation U Nu invited the military to form caretaker government. In 1958–60, the caretaker government under General Ne Win was formed. The caretaker government initially appeared to be interested in building state capacity. It reduced corruption, improved bureaucratic efficiency, and managed to deal with the pocket armies.
 March 1, 1962: Ne Win overthrows U Nu
 September 18, 1988: Saw Maung overthrows Maung Maung Kha
 February 1, 2021: Min Aung Hlaing overthrows Aung San Suu Kyi

Nepal 

On 1559 A.D. Drabya Shah killed the Khadka, Raja with his own hand with a sword, during the race with conspiracy and started the rule of his dynasty under Shahas.
On 31 October 1846. a political massacre organized by Jung Bahadur Rana reduced the Shah Monarch to a figurehead and made Prime Minister and other powers hereditary to Ranas.
 In 1882 Chautariya Colonel Ambar Bikram Shah and his Gorkhali aide attempted assassination of  Ranodip Singh but failed and were killed in Teku by the Ranas. 
 In 1885, the Shumsher family, murdered the family of Jung Bahadur and  Ranodip Singh to take over the occupied hereditary throne of Prime Minister and other powers   
 On 15 December 1960, King Mahendra dismissed the parliament of Nepal and arrested then PM B. P. Koirala and outlawed  Political parties. 
 On February 2005, King Gyanendra dismissed the parliament of Nepal and declared state of emergency.

Netherlands

Habsburg Netherlands 

 24 July 1577: capture of the Namur citadel by Don Juan of Austria has been considered a coup against the States-General of the Netherlands
 28 October 1577: coup by radical Calvinists Jan van Hembyse and François van Ryhove against the stadtholder of Flanders, Philippe III de Croÿ (Duke of Aarschot). They founded the Calvinist Republic of Ghent.
 7 September 1578: coup d'état by Johann VI, Count of Nassau-Dillenburg against the Hof van Gelre en Zutphen.
 23 January 1579: coup d'état by Johann VI, Count of Nassau-Dillenburg and four Gueldrian noblemen against the Hof van Gelre en Zutphen.

Dutch Republic 

 August 1618: Coup d'état by Maurice, Prince of Orange, see Trial of Oldenbarnevelt, Grotius and Hogerbeets.
 July–August 1650: Attack on Amsterdam (1650) and imprisonment of rival regenten by William II, Prince of Orange.
 20 August 1672:  was an Orangist coup against the Loevestein government.

Batavian Republic 

 22 January 1798: Uitvoerend Bewind against the National Assembly of the Batavian Republic
 12 June 1798: Herman Willem Daendels against Pieter Vreede
 19 September 1801: Napoleon Bonaparte against Uitvoerend Bewind

Kingdom of the Netherlands 

 27 November 1856: Luxembourg Coup of 1856, a reactionary revision of the Luxembourg constitution by William III of the Netherlands, the reigning Grand Duke of Luxembourg.
 9–14 November 1918: Red Week (Netherlands): a failed coup attempt by Troelstra against the Dutch government.

Nicaragua 
 1856 under William Walker
 June 6-9, 1936: Anastasio Somoza García overthrows Juan Bautista Sacasa
 1947 by Anastasio Somoza García for Benjamín Lacayo Sacasa against Leonardo Argüello Barreto

Niger 
 April 15, 1974: Seyni Kountché overthrows Hamani Diori.
 January 27, 1996: Ibrahim Baré Maïnassara overthrows Mahamane Ousmane.
 April 9, 1999: Daouda Malam Wanké overthrows Ibrahim Baré Maïnassara.
 February 18, 2010: Salou Djibo overthrows Mamadou Tandja.
 31 March 2021: Failed attempt by Captain Sani Saley Gourouza to overthrow Mahamadou Issoufou

Nigeria 

 January 15–16, 1966: Chukwuma Kaduna Nzeogwu overthrows Abubakar Tafawa Balewa
 July 29, 1966: Yakubu Gowon overthrows Johnson Aguiyi-Ironsi
 July 29, 1975: Murtala Mohammed overthrows Yakubu Gowon
 February 13, 1976: Buka Suka Dimka led a failed coup that resulted in the death of the head of state Murtala Mohammed
 December 31, 1983: Muhammadu Buhari overthrows Shehu Shagari
 August 27, 1985: Ibrahim Babangida overthrows Muhammadu Buhari
 April 22, 1990: Gideon Orkar failed to topple president Ibrahim Babangida
 November 17, 1993: Sani Abacha overthrows Ernest Shonekan

Norway 
 1537: Christian III of Denmark overthrew Regent Christopher, Count of Oldenburg and the Rigsraad, leading to the Count's Feud and the Norwegian Reformation.
 April 9, 1940: Vidkun Quisling announced a fascist government by radio broadcast in an attempt to overthrow the legally elected Labour government of Johan Nygaardsvold while Nazi Germany invaded the country; his coup was rejected as illegitimate by King Haakon VII and Quisling would hold little power during the Nazi occupation.

Oman 
 July 23, 1970: Qaboos bin Said overthrew his father Said bin Taimur during the Dhofar Rebellion.

Panama 
 January 3, 1931 by Arnulfo Arias Madrid and Harmodio Arias Madrid against Florencio Harmodio Arosemena
 October 9, 1941 by Ricardo Adolfo de la Guardia Arango against Arnulfo Arias Madrid
 May 9, 1951 by Colonel José Antonio Remón Cantera against Arnulfo Arias Madrid
 October 11, 1968 by Omar Torrijos against President Arnulfo Arias Madrid
 1989 coup attempt; Moises Giroldi attempted to overthrow President Manuel Antonio Noriega to prevent the U.S. invasion of Panama.

Pakistan 

March 9, 1951: Major General Akbar Khan against the Muslim League government of Prime Minister Liaquat Ali Khan in protest of the government's acceptance of a ceasefire in the First Indo-Pakistani War. This was the first attempted military coup in Pakistan's history.
October 27, 1958: Field Marshal Ayub Khan overthrows Iskander Mirza in response to his suspension of the Pakistani Constitution and declaration of Martial law. 
 March 25, 1969 by General Yahya Khan, Ayub Khan resigned.
July 4, 1977: General Muhammad Zia-ul-Haq and the Pakistan National Alliance overthrow Zulfikar Ali Bhutto after a contested general election. 
 1995: A group of Pakistani Armed Forces officers led by Zahirul Islam Abbasi plot to overthrow the Pakistan Peoples Party government of Benazir Bhutto
October 12, 1999: General Pervez Musharraf overthrows the PML-N government Prime Minister Nawaz Sharif and suspends the writ of the Constitution due to Sharif's intent to relieve him as Chairman of the Joint Chiefs of Staff.

Paraguay 
 September 4, 1880: Bernardino Caballero is appointed as interim president by the Congress after the death of the President Cándido Bareiro, and forced resignation by a coup of Vice president Adolfo Saguier.
 June 9, 1894: Juan Bautista Egusquiza overthrows Juan Gualberto González. Marcos Morínigo is appointed as interim president by the Congress.
 January 9, 1902: Bernardino Caballero overthrows Emilio Aceval. Andrés Héctor Carvallo is appointed as interim president by the Congress.
 December 19, 1904: Juan Antonio Escurra is deposed. Juan Bautista Gaona is appointed as interim president by the Congress.
 December 9, 1905: Juan Bautista Gaona is deposed. Cecilio Báez is appointed as interim president by the Congress.
 July 4, 1908: Benigno Ferreira is deposed.
 January 17, 1911: Albino Jara overthrows Manuel Gondra.
 January 14, 1912: Marcos Caballero Codas, Mario Uscher and Alfredo Aponte overthrow Liberato Marcial Rojas.
 February 28, 1912: Liberato Marcial Rojas is deposed. Pedro Pablo Peña is appointed as interim president by the Congress.
 March 22, 1912: Pedro Pablo Peña is deposed. Emiliano González Navero is appointed as interim president by the Congress.
 February 17, 1936: Rafael Franco overthrows Eusebio Ayala.
 August 13, 1937: Félix Paiva overthrows Rafael Franco.
 February 18, 1940: Self-coup by José Félix Estigarribia.
 June 3, 1948: Higinio Morínigo is deposed. Juan Manuel Frutos is appointed as interim president by the Congress.
 January 30, 1949: Juan Natalicio González is deposed. Raimundo Rolón is appointed as interim president by the Congress.
 February 26, 1949: Felipe Molas López overthrows Raimundo Rolón.
 September 11, 1949: Felipe Molas López is deposed. Federico Chaves is appointed as interim president by the Congress.
 May 4, 1954: Alfredo Stroessner overthrows Federico Chaves. Tomás Romero Pereira is appointed as interim president by the Congress.
 February 3, 1989: Andrés Rodríguez and the Paraguayan Army overthrow Alfredo Stroessner.

Peru 
  under José de la Riva-Agüero against the 
 1829 under Agustín Gamarra against José de La Mar
 1835 under Felipe Santiago Salaverry against Luis José de Orbegoso
 1842 under Juan Crisóstomo Torrico against Manuel Menéndez
 1865 under Mariano Ignacio Prado against Pedro Diez Canseco
 1872 under Tomás Gutiérrez against José Balta
 1879 under Nicolás de Piérola against Mariano Ignacio Prado
  under  against Augusto B. Leguía
  under Óscar Benavides against Guillermo Billinghurst
  under Augusto B. Leguía y Salcedo against José Pardo y Barreda
  under Luis Miguel Sánchez Cerro against Augusto B. Leguía y Salcedo
  under Manuel A. Odría against José Luis Bustamante y Rivero
 1962 under Ricardo Pérez Godoy against Manuel Prado Ugarteche
 1968 under Juan Velasco Alvarado against Fernando Belaúnde Terry
 February 1975 against Juan Velasco Alvarado (attempt)
 August 1975 under Francisco Morales-Bermúdez against Juan Velasco Alvarado
 April 1992 under Alberto Fujimori (self-coup)
  under  against Alberto Fujimori
  under Ollanta Humala against Alberto Fujimori
  under Antauro Humala against Alejandro Toledo
 2022 under Pedro Castillo (self-coup attempt)

Philippines 
From the 1565 Spanish conquest until 1898, there were than 20 failed Philippine revolts against Spain, including the Chinese revolts (1603, 1662), Dagohoy rebellion (1744–1825), Silang rebellion (1762–63), Pule revolt (1840–41), all crushed by the Spanish colonial government. Most of these were due to redress personal grievances (land use, unjust taxation, forced labor) and were not aimed to overthrow the government in Manila. The following list does show which plots did aim to overthrow the national government.
 1587–1588: Failed Tondo Conspiracy, crushed by the Spanish colonial government
 11 October 1719: Successful overthrow and assassination of Governor-General Fernando Manuel de Bustillo Bustamante y Rueda by supporters of Manila Archbishop Francisco de la Cuesta 
 1 June 1823: Failed revolt by Andrés Novales and Creole members of the Spanish Army crushed by the Spanish colonial government
 1828: Failed Palmero Conspiracy, thwarted by the Spanish colonial government
 20 January 1872: Failed Cavite mutiny, crushed by the Spanish colonial government
 5 December 1896: Failed Manila mutiny, crushed by the Spanish colonial government
 1896–98: Philippine Revolution, a war of independence against Spanish rule directed by the Katipunan society. First ended with the Pact of Biak-na-Bato between the Filipino and Spaniards, and the establishment of the Hong Kong Junta, then continued and led to the Philippine Declaration of Independence. Became intertwined with the Spanish–American War, where both Spaniards and Americans refused to recognize Philippine independence, and led to the Spanish cession of the Spanish East Indies to the United States.
 1899–1901: Philippine–American War, First Philippine Republic against the United States after the Spanish cession of the Spanish East Indies, ended with the surrender of the Filipinos
 2 May 1935: Failed Sakdalista Rebellion against United States, crushed by the American colonial government.
 1942–1954: Failed Hukbalahap Rebellion against Japan and later the government of the Philippines, ended with the surrender of the Huks.
 21 May 1967: Failed overthrow by Lapiang Malaya of the Third Philippine Republic led by President Ferdinand Marcos, ended with government forces killing and arresting the participants.
 26 January–17 March 1970: First Quarter Storm, massive protests against Ferdinand Marcos.
 21 September 1972: Self-coup of Ferdinand Marcos by declaring martial law.
 22–25 February 1986: Successful People Power Revolution, civilian-backed military coup led by Juan Ponce Enrile and Fidel V. Ramos overthrew Marcos as president.
 6–8 July 1986: Failed coup attempt, known as the Manila Hotel plot, in the Philippines led by former senator and vice presidential candidate Arturo Tolentino together with 490 armed soldiers and 15,000 civilians loyal to former President Ferdinand Marcos, crushed by the Philippine government.
 11 November 1986: Failed coup attempt, known as the "God Save the Queen" Plot, in the Philippines led by Juan Ponce Enrile, ended with the removal of Enrile and re-organization of her cabinet.
 27–29 January 1987: Failed coup attempt, known as the GMA-7 incident, in the Philippines led by Colonel Oscar Canlas, ended with one rebel soldier killed, and 35 others injured.
 18 April 1987: Failed coup attempt, known as the Black Saturday incident, ended with one rebel soldier killed.
 13 July 1987: Alleged coup attempt, known as the MIA plot, ended with four officers being sued in military court.
 28–29 August 1987: Failed coup attempt, known as the August 1987 Coup, in the Philippines led by Col. Gregorio Honasan, crushed by the Philippine government.
 1–9 December 1989: December 1989 coup attempt, failed coup attempt led by Col. Gregorio Honasan together with soldiers loyal to former President Marcos, crushed by the Philippine government.
 4 March 1990: Hotel Delfino siege, government troops under Brigadier General Oscar Florendo fought against rebel forces led by suspended Cagayan Governor Rodolfo "Agi" Aguinaldo, crushed by the Philippine government.
 4–6 October 1990: Failed mutiny known as the Mindanao crisis, mutinying soldiers staged a dawn raid on an army base in Mindanao, defeated by the government.
 17–20 January 2001: Successful Second EDSA Revolution: A four-day political protest were held in EDSA, that peacefully overthrew the government of President Joseph Estrada
 25 April–1 May 2001: Failed EDSA III: A seven-day political protest were held also in EDSA, in a failed attempt to bring back Joseph Estrada to power.
 27 July 2003: Failed Oakwood mutiny, failed coup attempt with mutinous soldiers surrendering after taking over the Oakwood condominiums in the Makati Central Business District.
 24 February 2006: State of emergency to forestall alleged coup against the government
 29 November 2007: Failed Manila Peninsula siege, mutinous soldiers occupied The Peninsula Manila Hotel, later surrendered to the government.

Alleged plots that have not been attempted yet:
 2018–2021: Allegations of ouster plot against President Rodrigo Duterte was first publicized by the military, who mainly implicated the opposition figures and the critics of the Duterte administration of involvement in the plot.

Rebellions that have not yet led to the point where the rebels have a chance of overthrowing the government:
 1565–1898: Spanish–Moro conflict, Spain failed to subjugate the Moros until the cession of the Spanish East Indies to the United States.
 1899–1913: Moro Rebellion, United States defeated the Moros, annexed their territories to the Philippine Islands.
 1969–2019: Moro conflict, Tripoli Agreement with the Moro National Liberation Front (MNLF) in 1976, Final Peace Agreement with the MNLF in 1996, peace deal with the Moro Islamic Liberation Front (MILF) in 2014, establishment of the Bangsamoro in 2019.
 1969–present: Communist rebellion in the Philippines, currently ongoing, primarily by the New People's Army (NPA). Breakaway groups of the NPA has had peace deals with the Philippine government: with the Cordillera People's Liberation Army in 1986, and with the Revolutionary Proletarian Army in 2000.

Attempts to wrest control of a chamber of Congress, while are plots, are not coups because it doesn't fit the definition of "removal of an existing government from power" as the head of state and government are not at stake (The Philippines uses the presidential system of government with separation of powers). There had been several instances of this, the latest of which were in 2020 in the House of Representatives and in 2018 in the Senate. One example was in March–April 1952 when the Senate presidency was changed three times.

Poland 
 1919 Polish coup attempt: National Democratic attempt led by Marian Januszajtis-Żegota and Prince Eustachy Sapieha to overthrow Jędrzej Moraczewski and Józef Piłsudski's left-wing government 
May 1926: Józef Piłsudski overthrew the Chjeno-Piast government of President Stanisław Wojciechowski and Prime Minister Wincenty Witos, appointing Kazimierz Bartel as the new Prime Minister and beginning the Sanation regime.  
 December 13, 1981: General Wojciech Jaruzelski declares martial law and bans the Solidarity union, forming the Military Council of National Salvation

Portugal 
 147–139 BC: The Lusitanian Rebellion against the Roman forces in modern-day Portugal, led by Lusitanian leader named Viriatus.
 1820: Liberal Revolution 
 1824: April Revolt
 1846: Revolution of Maria da Fonte
 1910: A republican coup d'état deposes King Manuel II of Portugal and establishes the Portuguese First Republic.
 1915: May 14 Revolt overthrows Pimenta de Castro's government
 1917: December 1917 coup d'état leads to Sidónio Pais' Dictatorship
 1925: failed Military coup the Generals on 18 April 1925
 1925: failed Revolt Mendes Cabecadas on 19 July 1925
 1926: General Manuel Gomes da Costa and the Portuguese Armed Forces overthrows the First Portuguese Republic, establishing the Ditadura Nacional. 
 1974: The Movimento das Forças Armadas overthrows the Estado Novo Military dictatorship led by President Américo Tomás, founding the National Salvation Junta. 
 1975: Failed coup after the Carnation Revolution by far-left militants who hoped to establish a Communist government in Portugal.

Romania 
 1866 by the "monstrous coalition" of Liberals and Conservatives against Prince Alexandru Ioan Cuza
 1938: King Carol II of Romania against Corneliu Zelea Codreanu and the Iron Guard
 1940: Horia Sima and Ion Antonescu overthrow Carol II of Romania and create the National Legionary State. 
 1941: The Iron Guard unsuccessfully revolts against Ion Antonescu, leading to the suppression of the Iron Guard and a major pogrom in Bucharest. 
 1944: King Michael I of Romania and Constantin Sănătescu remove Ion Antonescu's government from power due to the Soviet invasion of Romania. 
 1947: Prime Minister Petru Groza forces King Michael I to abdicate, forming the Socialist Republic of Romania. 
1989 – Romanian Revolution: Ion Iliescu and his National Salvation Front overthrow Nicolae Ceasescu alongside a series of civil unrest and uprisings, ending the Romanian Communist Party's rule.

Russia

Russian Empire
 1762: A coup by Catherine the Great forced the abdication of Peter III of Russia.
 December 1825: Decembrist revolt attempted to depose Tsar Nicholas I of Russia in favor of his brother, Grand Duke Konstantin by military coup.

Revolutionary Russia
 March 15, 1917: Tsar Nicholas II of Russia is forced to abdicate in favor of the Russian Provisional Government, ending the Romanov dynasty.
September 1917: Lavr Kornilov attempts to march into Petrograd, overthrow the Provisional Government, dissolve the Petrograd Soviet and possibly establish a military dictatorship after being appointed Commander-in-Chief of the Russian Army by Alexander Kerensky. The coup failed because of a lack of support and mass resistance, but it eroded the Provisional Government's legitimacy and revived the Bolsheviks. It also resulted in the provisional government formally abolishing the Russian monarchy and proclaiming the Russian Republic.  
 November 7, 1917: The Bolshevik faction of the Russian Social Democratic Labor Party led by Vladimir Lenin overthrows the Russian Provisional Government and forms the Russian Soviet Federative Socialist Republic, leading to the Russian Civil War and the formation of the Soviet Union.
 Summer of 1918: Ambassadors' plot, failed attempt by Sidney Reilly et al. to remove the Bolsheviks from power.

Soviet Union
 June 1957: the ’Anti-Party Group’ tries unsuccessfully to remove Nikita Khrushchev from power
 13 October 1964: Nikita Khrushchev is forced to resign, handing the power to Leonid Brezhnev
 August 19 to 21, 1991: A group of Soviet Communist Party hardliners form the State Committee on the State of Emergency and attempt to overthrow President Mikhail Gorbachev in order to reverse his reforms; the coup is suppressed by RSFSR President Boris Yeltsin, weakening the Communist Party's authority and accelerating the dissolution of the Soviet Union.

Russian Federation
 September 21 to October 4, 1993: Russian President Boris Yeltsin, aided by the Russian Armed Forces, extralegally dissolves the Supreme Soviet and suspends the constitution in response to impeachment proceedings against him.

Rwanda 
 July 5, 1973: Juvénal Habyarimana overthrows Grégoire Kayibanda

São Tomé and Príncipe 
 August 15, 1995: Manuel Quintas de Almeida overthrows Miguel Trovoada for 6 days
 July 16, 2003: Fernando Pereira (major) overthrows Fradique de Menezes for 7 days
 November 24–25, 2022.

Saudi Arabia 
 November 1964: At the request of Crown Prince Faisal (Ibn Saud's third son), his brother Muhammad bin Abdulaziz (Ibn Saud's fourth son) led a palace coup which ousted King Saud (Ibn Saud's second son), making Faisal king.
 1969 Saudi Arabian coup d'état attempt: Members of the Royal Saudi Air Force inspired by the Free Officers Movement in Libya attempted to overthrow King Faisal.
 21 June 2017: Mohammad bin Salman overthrows Muhammad bin Nayef

Scotland 
1688: The Glorious Revolution: William III of Orange's invasion of England and Scotland at the invitation of the country's powerful Protestants, deposing the Catholic James II of England and VII of Scotland

Serbia 
 May 28–29, 1903: May Coup

Seychelles 
 June 5, 1977: France-Albert René overthrows James Mancham
 November 25, 1981: South African mercenaries attempt to replace France-Albert René with the former president James Mancham
 1986: The Indian Navy attempted to overthrow France-Albert René.

Sierra Leone 
 March 21, 1967: David Lansana overthrows Siaka Stevens
 April 19, 1968: John Amadu Bangura overthrows Andrew Juxon-Smith
 April 29, 1992: Valentine Strasser overthrows Joseph Saidu Momoh
 January 16, 1996: Julius Maada Bio overthrows Valentine Strasser
 May 25, 1997: Johnny Paul Koroma overthrows Ahmed Tejan Kabbah

Solomon Islands 
 June 5th, 2000: Malaita Eagle Force overthrows Prime Minister Bartholomew Ulufa'alu

Somalia 
 October 21, 1969: Muhammad Siad Barre overthrows Sheikh Mukhtar Mohamed Hussein
 January 26, 1991: Mohammed Farrah Aidid and the United Somali Congress overthrow Muhammad Siad Barre, beginning the Somali Civil War.

Spain

Hispania, Septimania and Galicia 
 603: by General Witerico against king Liuva II
 631: by Duke Sisenando against King Suintila
 642: Tulga was overthrown by Chindasvinto
 692: Égica was briefly overthrown by Suniefredo

Kingdom of Spain 
 1814: Absolutist pronunciamiento of Fernando VII and Francisco Javier de Elío 
 1815: failed liberal pronunciamiento of Juan Díaz Porlier at A Coruña
 1820: successful liberal pronunciamiento of Rafael del Riego, start of the Trienio Liberal 
 1822: failed absolutist coup by the Royal Guard of Fernando VII 
 1831: failed liberal pronunciamiento of Manuel de Torrijos
 1835: liberal pronunciamiento of Cordero y de Quesada
 1836: successful liberal mutiny of La Granja de San Ildefonso
 1841: failed Moderate pronunciamiento 
 1843: successful Moderate pronunciamiento of Narváez and Francisco Serrano y Domínguez, end of the Baldomero Espartero regency
 1844: failed liberal and Esparterist coup, led by Martín Zurbano
 1846: failed progressive liberal military and civic revolt in Galicia, led by Miguel Solís Cuetos
 1848: failed progressive liberal military and civic revolt in Madrid, led by colonel Manuel Buceta
 1854: successful revolutionary coup in Madrid, led by general Leopoldo O'Donnell
 1860: failed carlist military uprising at Sant Carles de la Ràpita, led by general Jaime Ortega y Olleta
 1866: failed Progressive and Democrat coup in Madrid
 1866: failed pronunciamiento of Villarejo de Salvanés, led by general Juan Prim
 1868: successful Glorious Revolution, started by the pronunciamiento of Juan Bautista Topete in Cádiz
 1874: successful coup led by General Pavía 
 1874: successful "Pronunciamiento de Sagunto", that ends the Spanish First Republic and restores monarchy and the Borbón family at the throne
 1883: failed 5 August republican pronunciamiento in Badajoz
 1886: failed republican coup in Madrid, led by Manuel Villacampa del Castillo and Manuel Ruiz Zorrilla
 1923: Spanish Army regiments led by Miguel Primo de Rivera overthrew Prime Minister Manuel García Prieto and established a dictatorship with the support of King Alfonso XIII. 
 1926: failed "Sanjuanada", a coup against the dictatorship of Miguel Primo de Rivera
 1929: failed coup against the dictatorship of Miguel Primo de Rivera, led by José Sánchez-Guerra y Martínez
 1930: Jaca uprising: Fermín Galán led a failed republican pronunciamiento against the Spanish monarchy in Jaca. 
 August 10, 1932; José Sanjurjo unsuccessfully tried to overthrow Prime Minister Manuel Azaña's Republican Left government, although the coup plotters were in disagreement over whether to next dissolve the Second Spanish Republic. 
 July 1936: A military uprising lead by Emilio Mola in which Francisco Franco participated, against Prime Minister Manuel Azaña and the Second Spanish Republic, starting the Spanish Civil War
 1939: Segismundo Casado and Julián Besteiro overthrow the PSOE government of Juan Negrín in Republican-controlled Spain in order to negotiate a ceasefire with the Nationalists, forming the National Defense Council.
 November 17, 1978: An aborted Guardia Civil coup led by Antonio Tejero to stop the Spanish transition to democracy.
 February 23, 1981: A faction of the Spanish Armed Forces led by Tejero broke into the Congress of Deputies while they were preparing to elect Leopoldo Calvo-Sotelo as the new Prime Minister. King Juan Carlos denounced the coup in a nationally televised address, and the coup collapsed the next day with no casualties.
 October 27, 1982: A group of far-right colonels failed to overthrow Leopoldo Calvo-Sotelo.
 June 2, 1985: a group of far-right soldiers and officers (along with some civilians) planned to take power following a false flag attack, but the conspiracy was later aborted.

Sri Lanka 
1962 Ceylonese coup d'état attempt: Christian military officers attempted to topple the current government under Sirimavo Bandaranaike.

Sudan 
 November 16, 1958: Ibrahim Abboud overthrows Abdallah Khalil
 1964: The October Revolution in Sudan, driven by a general strike and rioting, forced President Ibrahim Abboud to transfer executive power to a transitional civilian government, and eventually to resign.
 May 25, 1969: Gaafar al-Nimeiry overthrows Ismail al-Azhari
 July 19–22, 1971: Communist members of the National Revolutionary Command Council led by Hashem al Atta attempted to overthrow al-Nimeiry but failed due to a lack of support. 
 2 February 1977: Failed coup attempt in Juba by former members of the Anyanya in the Sudanese Air Force
 April 6, 1985: Abdel Rahman Swar al-Dahab overthrows Gaafar al-Nimeiry, establishing the Transitional Military Council.
 June 30, 1989: Omar Hassan Ahmad al-Bashir and the National Islamic Front overthrows President Ahmed al-Mirghani and Prime Minister Sadiq al-Mahdi, creating the Revolutionary Command Council for National Salvation
 10 April 2019: The Sudanese Armed Forces led by Ahmed Awad Ibn Auf overthrow Omar Hassan Ahmad al-Bashir during the Sudanese Revolution
 21 September 2021: An attempted coup against the ruling Sovereignty Council by forces loyal to Omar Hassan Ahmad al-Bashir fails
 25 October 2021: The Sudanese military, led by Abdel Fattah al-Burhan, seizes control of the government following the arrest of Prime Minister Abdalla Hamdok and other civilian members of the Sovereignty Council

Suriname 
 May 25/26, 1910: failed coup d'état by police officer Frans Killinger.
 November 7/8, 1947: failed coup d'état by Simon Sanches.
 February 25, 1980: military coup led by Dési Bouterse ousts Prime Minister Henck Arron.
 August 13, 1980: the military led by Dési Bouterse ousts President Johan Ferrier.
 March 15, 1981: failed counter coup/conspiracy by Wilfred Hawker.
 March 10/11, 1982: failed counter coup by Surendre Rambocus.
 December 24, 1990: President Ramsewak Shankar dismissed by Suriname's military.

Switzerland 
 1717: Wilchingen against the City of Schaffhausen
 1719: Werdenberg against Glarus
 1723: Military led by Major Abraham Davel (Vaud) against City of Bern
 1726: Peasants of Jura against Bistum of Basel
 1755: Leventina (Ticino) against Canton Uri
 1781: Chenaux (Fribourg) against Canton Fribourg
 1797: Peasants of Baselgebiet against the City of Basel and ousted Peter Ochs and Peter Vischer
 January 8, 1800: Republicans (Hans Konrad Escher, Paul Usteri, Albrecht Rengger, Bernhard Friedrich Kuhn.) ousting the Patriots ( Karl Albrecht von Frisching, Karl von Müller-Friedberg und Carl Heinrich Gschwend)
 August 7, 1800: Patriots ousting the Republicans
 October, 27/28 1801: Federalist (Alois Reding & Johann Rudolf von Frisching) with help of the French Raymond Verninac ousting Unitarier and Patriots
 April 17, 1802: Unitarier under the Lead of Bernhard Friedrich Kuhns ousting the Federalist Alois Reding
 September 6, 1839: Züriputsch: Radical Movement under the lead of Conrad Melchior Hirzel & Fridrich Ludwig Keller ousting the Liberals. Killing of Johannes Hegtschweiler.

Sweden 
 18 May 1160, successful: king Eric the Holy is killed on orders of Magnus Henriksson, who takes power as king Magnus II of Sweden
 12 April 1167, successful: king Charles Sverkersson (later sometimes called ”Charles VII”) is killed by men loyal to Canute Ericsson, who was deckared king and consolidated his power in 1173
 14 June 1275, successful: Battle of Hova, king Valdemar I is overthrown and replaced by his brother who becomes king Magnus III
 1439, successful: king Eric of Denmark, Sweden and Norway (Kalmar Union) was deposed in a coup from the Danish and Swedish thrones, in 1440 also from the Norwegian throne.
 June 1448, successful: Charles Canutesson is elected and hailed as king of Sweden under the preassure of his own private army
 1457, successful: Charles Canutesson is ousted following a rebellion by the archbishop and the high nobility
 1520, successful: Battle of Bogesund and Stockholm Bloodbath, Christian II of Denmark deposes Sten Sture the Younger and becomes king of Sweden
 1521–3, successful: the Vasa rebellion deposes Christian II, effectively finally ending the Kalmar Union and making Gustaf Vasa king Gustaf I of Sweden
 1568–9, successful: a rebellion among the estate of the nobility deposes king Eric XIV of Sweden and inserts his brother as king John III of Sweden
 1569, failed: The 1569 plot against John III of Sweden, seeking to reinstate Eric XIV of Sweden
 1574, failed: Mornay Plot against John III, seeking to reinstate Eric XIV
 1576, failed: The 1576 plot against John III, seeking to reinstate Eric XIV
 1598–1600, successful: War against Sigismund in 1598–9 and Linköping Bloodbath in 1600, Sigismund of Sweden was deposed and succeeded by his uncle Duke Charles, some years later crowned as Charles IX of Sweden
 1756, failed: Coup of 1756 of queen Louisa Ulrika against the Riksdag of the Estates
 1772, successful: Revolution of 1772; king Gustaf III of Sweden dismissed the Riksdag of the Estates, ending the Age of Liberty
 1789, failed: 1789 Conspiracy of Charlotte of Holstein-Gottorp against her brother-in-law Gustaf III
 1793, failed: Armfelt Conspiracy by Gustaf Mauritz Armfelt, in companionship with Magdalena Rudenschöld, with the intent to depose the guardian government of king Gustav IV Adolf of Sweden, is exposed.
 1809, successful: Coup of 1809; a number of noblemen in the Swedish Army overthrew king Gustav IV Adolf of Sweden after the Finnish War
 1917–8, failed/cancelled: riots in Stockholm is followed by Socialist threats of revolution, but the plans are never realized; however, king Gustaf V is finally accepting parliamentarism and appoints Nils Edén as prime minister for a Liberal-Social Democrat coalition government to ease political tension

Syria 
 1925–1927: The Great Syrian Revolt, a revolt initiated by the Druze and led by Sultan al-Atrash against French Mandate.
 March 29, 1949 by Husni al-Za'im against Shukri al-Quwatli
 August 14, 1949 by Sami al-Hinnawi against Husni al-Za'im
 December 3, 1951 by Adib Shishakli against Hashim al-Atassi
 February 25, 1954 by Maamun al-Kuzbari against Adib Shishakli
 September 29, 1961 by Haydar al-Kuzbari and others against Gamal Abdel Nasser
 March 8, 1963: Lu'ayy al-Atasi and the Arab Socialist Ba'ath Party – Syria Region overthrow the Second Syrian Republic under Nazim al-Kudsi
 February 21–23, 1966: Salah Jadid overthrows Amin al-Hafiz and the Ba'ath National Command, leading to a split in the Ba'ath Party. 
 November 13, 1970: Hafez al-Assad overthrows Salah Jadid

Thailand 
The number of coups in Thailand—whether successful or unsuccessful— is uncertain, leading one academic to call for a concerted effort to make a definitive list.
According to Paul Chambers, a professor at Chiang Mai University's Institute for South-East Asian Affairs, there have been almost 30 coup attempts in Thailand (whether successful or unsuccessful) since 1912. Some count 11 coups since 1932. Others claim there were 13 since 1932.

 1912: Coup planned by military officers is discovered and thwarted.
 24 June 1932: The Khana Ratsadon party overthrows the absolute monarchy of King Prajadhipok.
 1 April 1933: Phraya Manopakorn Nitithada dissolves a government of the People's Party and ousted Pridi Banomyong, the leader of the party, out of the country.
 20 June 1933: Phraya Phahon Phonphayuhasena overthrows Phraya Manopakorn Nititada.
 11–23 October 1933: Royalist rebellion to overturn the results of the June 1933 coup d'état.
 3 August 1935: The Nai Sip rebellion.
 29 January 1939: More a purge or internal coup, it was the work of Prime Minister Phibul to remove political enemies and rivals.
 7 November 1947: Phin Choonhavan overthrows Thawal Thamrong Navaswadhi.
 Thai 1949 Coup: Attempted coup by Pridi, which saw the Grand Palace occupied by his supporters, failed.
 29 June 1951: Pridi supporters in the navy attempted a coup when they tried to seize Phibun.
 29 November 1951: Military overthrows 1949 constitution and reverts to 1932 constitution.
 21 September 1957: Sarit Thanarat overthrows Plaek Pibulsongkram
 20 October 1958: Self-coup of Sarit Thanarat
 18 November 1971: Self-coup of Thanom Kittikachorn
 February 1976: An attempted military coup was defeated in February.
 6 October 1976: Sangad Chaloryu overthrows Seni Pramoj
 20 October 1977: Kriangsak Chamanan overthrows Thanin Kraivichien
 1 April 1981: A coup led by the deputy commander-in-chief of the army failed when forces loyal to the government suppressed the revolt. The "Young Turk" group of officers who staged the coup were dismissed from the army.
 9 September 1985: A coup attempt by Col. Manoonkrit Roopkachorn, a member of the Young Turks, failed and a number of senior officers were later arrested.
 23 February 1991: Sunthorn Kongsompong overthrows Chatichai Choonhavan
 19 September 2006: Sonthi Boonyaratglin overthrows Thaksin Shinawatra
 22 May 2014: Prayut Chan-o-cha overthrows Niwatthamrong Boonsongpaisan

Togo 
 January 13, 1963: Étienne Eyadéma and Emmanuel Bodjollé overthrow Sylvanus Olympio
 January 13, 1967: Étienne Eyadéma and Kléber Dadjo overthrow Nicolas Grunitzky

Transkei 
 December 30, 1987: Bantu Holomisa overthrows Stella Sigcau.

Tunisia 
 July 15, 1957: Habib Bourguiba overthrows King Muhammad VIII al-Amin
 November 7, 1987: Zine El Abidine Ben Ali overthrows Habib Bourguiba

Tuva 
 January, 1929: Pro-Soviet, anti-Buddhist faction of the Tuvan People's Revolutionary Party overthrows the government of the Tuvan People's Republic, in modern Tuva.

Turkey 
 1807-08: The Janissaries led by Kabakçı Mustafa overthrew Sultan Selim III to halt his Nizam-I Cedid reforms after the 1806 Edirne incident, disbanding his new military and replacing him with Mustafa IV. However, rebels led by Mustafa Bayrakdar overthrew the Janissary regime and placed Mahmud II on the throne. 
May 15, 1826: The Janissaries revolted and attempted to overthrow Sultan Mahmud II in opposition to his military modernizations, but he had the Sipahis force them back to their barracks and permanently disbanded them. 
: Due to the public discontent caused by crop failures, public debt and excessive spending, 32nd Sultan of the Ottoman Empire Abdulaziz was deposed by his ministers on 30 May 1876 and found dead several days later, which was attributed to suicide. He was replaced by Murad V.
1909: Islamist factions in the Ottoman Army attempted to overthrow the new Ottoman General Assembly and restore Sultan Abdülhamit II to absolute rule, capturing control of Constantinople for 11 days. Ended with its suppression by Mahmud Shevket Pasha's Third Army, forcing the Sultan to abdicate. 
1912: The "Saviour Officers" of the opposition Freedom and Accord Party overthrow the Committee of Union and Progress after the rigged 1912 general election.
January 23, 1913: The Committee of Union and Progress overthrows Grand Vizier Kâmil Pasha after the First Balkan War, leading to the rule of the "Three Pashas" in the Ottoman Empire.
 May 27, 1960: A group of mid ranking Turkish Armed Forces officers, later called the National Unity Committee, overthrows the Democrat Party government led by Prime Minister Adnan Menderes
 February 22, 1962: A failed coup attempt led by Colonel Talat Aydemir due to the discontent by the election results on July 9, 1961.
 May 20, 1963: A second failed coup attempt led by officers loyal to Colonel Talat Aydemir who was retired after the previous coup attempt. The plotters were motivated by the purges of army officers that took part on May 27, 1960, coup. İsmet İnönü's government prevented the coup. Colonel Talat Aydemir, who was granted amnesty for the previous attempt, was executed.
 March 9, 1971: A coup attempt by leftist army officers was thwarted.
 March 12, 1971 under four force commanders of the Turkish Armed Forces overthrows Süleyman Demirel
 September 12, 1980: Chief of the General Staff Kenan Evren overthrows the government led by Prime Minister Süleyman Demirel in response to widespread political violence. 
 February 28, 1997: the General Staff issues a memorandum demanding the reversal of several policies of the Islamist government of Necmettin Erbakan, precipitating its collapse. Due to the lack of an overt military takeover, the event is popularly known as the "postmodern coup".
 April 27, 2007: Amidst a political deadlock concerning ongoing presidential elections, the General Staff issues a statement, later called E-memorandum, about the presidential election understood to be a criticism of the ruling Justice and Development Party's candidate, Abdullah Gül. The crisis was resolved by an early election held later that year, which resulted in Gul's winning the presidency in a landslide.
 July 15, 2016: A group within the Turkish military linked by the Turkish government to the Gulen movement, the Peace at Home Council, made a failed military attempt to overthrow the government of President Recep Tayyip Erdoğan.

Trinidad and Tobago 
July 27 – August 1, 1990: Failed coup attempt by Islamist Jamaat al Muslimeen organization led by Yasin Abu Bakr against Prime Minister A. N. R. Robinson

Uganda 
 February 1966: Milton Obote overthrows King Mutesa II of Buganda
 January 25, 1971: Idi Amin overthrows Milton Obote
 May 12, 1980: Paulo Muwanga overthrows Godfrey Binaisa
 July 27, 1985: Tito Okello Lutwa overthrows Milton Obote
 January 26, 1986: Yoweri Museveni overthrows Tito Okello Lutwa

Ukraine 
 April 29, 1918: Pavlo Skoropadskyi overthrows the socialist government of the Central Council of Ukraine
 December 14, 1918: Directorate of Ukraine overthrows Pavlo Skoropadskyi
 February 2022: Failed 2022 coup attempt in Ukraine to take control of various Ukrainian cities by pro-Russian rebels, install pro-Russian rule in them and transfer cities to the Russian army during 2022 Russian invasion of Ukraine.

United Kingdom 
 1802: Despard Plot; plan by Edward Despard to assassinate King George III and stage a popular uprising in London; suppressed by the government.
 1820 Cato Street Conspiracy to murder Prime Minister Lord Liverpool and his cabinet; intercepted and suppressed in the planning stages
 1913 (March): During the suffragette bombing and arson campaign, a plot to kidnap Home Secretary Reginald McKenna was revealed and discussed in the House of Commons and in the press. It was revealed that suffragettes were planning to kidnap one or more cabinet ministers and subjecting them to force-feeding, until they conceded women's suffrage. After the publicization of the plans, the plans were aborted.
 1913: During the suffragette bombing and arson campaign, Special Branch detectives discovered that the WSPU had plans to create a suffragette "army" known as the "People's Training Corps" and informally as "Mrs Pankhurst's Army". The army was intended to proceed in force to Downing Street to imprison ministers until they conceded women's suffrage. After the discovery of the plans, they were aborted.
 1968/1974 Harold Wilson conspiracies: Several British politicians, including Prime Minister Harold Wilson himself, theorized that Conservative elements in MI5 and the British Armed Forces were plotting to overthrow his Labour government.

United States

Prior to independence 
 December 21, 1719: Local military officers in colonial South Carolina overthrew the Lords Proprietors.

Federal level 
 March 1783: The Continental Army may have planned to overthrow the Confederation Congress, but the conspiracy failed after Gen. George Washington refused to join.
 August 29, 1786: Daniel Shays leads a march on the federal Springfield Armory in an unsuccessful attempt to seize its weaponry and overthrow the government. The federal government found itself unable to finance troops to put down the rebellion, and it was consequently put down by the Massachusetts State militia and a privately funded local militia. The widely held view was that the Articles of Confederation needed to be reformed as the country's governing document, and the events of the rebellion served as a catalyst for the Constitutional Convention and the creation of the new government.
  1933-34: A group of businessmen were said to be conspiring to overthrow Franklin Roosevelt and install a fascist dictatorship. It is said to have failed when Smedley Butler refused to participate and instead testified before Congress.
 November 3, 2020 – January 7, 2021: After Joe Biden won the 2020 United States presidential election, President Donald Trump pursued an effort to overturn the election, with support and assistance from his campaign, proxies, political allies, and general public supporters. These efforts culminated in the January 6 United States Capitol attack, during which Trump supporters violently stormed the Capitol in a failed attempt to stop the Congressional certification of the election.

State level 
 1841–42: Failed gubernatorial candidate Thomas Wilson Dorr attempted to install a new government of Rhode Island under a different constitution.
 March 16, 1861: The Texas Legislature deposed governor Sam Houston after he refused to swear allegiance to the Confederate States of America following the secession of Texas from the United States and replaced him with Edward Clark.
 April 15, 1874: Failed gubernatorial candidate Joseph Brooks launched a coup against Arkansas governor Elisha Baxter, setting off a violent struggle between the state's two Republican Party leaders.
 September 14, 1874: The White League overthrew the government of Louisiana in New Orleans, holding statehouse, armory, and downtown for three days until the coup was suppressed by the 22nd Infantry Regiment under the Insurrection Act of 1807.
 October 8, 2020: The U.S. Federal Bureau of Investigation (FBI) announced the arrests of 13 men suspected of orchestrating a domestic terror plot to kidnap American politician Gretchen Whitmer, the Governor of Michigan, and otherwise using violence to overthrow the state government.

Counties and municipalities 
 November 10, 1898: White-supremacist Southern Democrats overthrew the biracial Fusionist ruling coalition of Wilmington, North Carolina
 August 2, 1946: Citizens led by returning WWII veterans overthrow the allegedly corrupt government of McMinn County, Tennessee.

Uruguay 
 February 10, 1898: Self-coup by Juan Lindolfo Cuestas.
 March 31, 1933: Self-coup by Gabriel Terra.
 February 21, 1942: Self-coup by Alfredo Baldomir, sometimes known as the Golpe bueno (the "Good coup").
 June 27, 1973: Juan María Bordaberry closed parliament and established a civic-military dictatorship

Venda 
 April 5, 1990: Gabriel Ramushwana overthrows Frank Ravele

Venezuela 
 December 19, 1908: Juan Vicente Gómez declares himself president after Cipriano Castro leaves for Europe to receive medical treatment
 October 18, 1945: President Isaías Medina Angarita was overthrown by a rebellion and a popular movement, which saw a transition to a democratic government
 November 24, 1948: A military junta, led by Carlos Delgado Chalbaud overthrows the democratically elected president Rómulo Gallegos
 January 22–23, 1958: A popular unrest and military support achieved the overthrow of the dictatorial government of Marcos Pérez Jiménez, forming a transitional government led by Rear Admiral Wolfgang Larrazábal and Edgar Sanabria
 February 4–5, 1992: A failed coup attempt against President Carlos Andrés Pérez led by Hugo Chávez and his group MBR-200
 November 27, 1992: A failed coup where a group of remnant officers loyal to the Hugo Chávez-led MBR-200 attempt to seize control of the government
 April 11–13, 2002: Brief coup against Hugo Chávez led by the country's military high command during a general strike called by the business federation Fedecámaras and the Confederation of Workers of Venezuela

Vietnam 
 October 1459: Emperor Lê Nhân Tông was deposed and killed in a coup led by Lê Nghi Dân
 May 1460: Failed coup against emperor Lê Nghi Dân
 6 June 1460: Emperor Lê Nghi Dân was deposed (and possibly killed) in a coup by officials, who enthroned Lê Thánh Tông.
 November 1509: Emperor Lê Uy Mục was deposed in a coup led by Lê Tương Dực
 Spring 1516: Emperor Lê Tương Dực was deposed in a military coup; the army enthroned his nephew Lê Chiêu Tông
 1524: Emperor Lê Chiêu Tông fled the capital due to a rebellion; general Mạc Đăng Dung quashed the rebellion, seized the opportunity to stage a coup against the emperor (who was killed by Mạc's supporters soon after), and enthroned his brother Lê Cung Hoàng.
 15 June 1527: Emperor Lê Cung Hoàng, the puppet of general Mạc Đăng Dung, was deposed and executed in a military coup by Mạc, who proclaimed himself the emperor of his own new Mạc dynasty. This led to the Lê–Mạc War (1527/33–1592).

South Vietnam 
 1960: Lieutenant-Colonel Vương Văn Đông and Colonel Nguyễn Chánh Thi of the Airborne Division of the Army of the Republic of Vietnam failed to depose of President Ngo Dinh Diem.
 1963:  General Dương Văn Minh led a group of Army of the Republic of Vietnam officers to oust President Ngo Dinh Diem in response to Ngo's handling of the Buddhist crisis.
 January 1964: General Nguyễn Khánh ousted the military junta led by General Dương Văn Minh in a bloodless coup.
 September 1964: Generals Lâm Văn Phát and Dương Văn Đức failed to overthrow the ruling military junta led by General Nguyễn Khánh. The attempt collapsed without any casualties.
 December 1964: The ruling military junta, led by General Nguyễn Khánh dissolves the High National Council.
 1965: Army units commanded by General Lâm Văn Phát and Colonel Phạm Ngọc Thảo fight to a stalemate with those of the ruling military junta, led by General Nguyễn Khánh. Following this, however, General Nguyễn Cao Kỳ and Air Marshal Nguyễn Chánh Thi (hostile to both the plotters and to Khánh himself) seized power themselves with the backing of the United States. They then forced Khánh into exile.

Yemen 
 1948: The Alwazir family assassinated Imam Yahya of the Mutawakkilite Kingdom of Yemen.
 1962 under Abdullah al-Sallal
 1974 under Ibrahim al-Hamdi
 2014–2015 a semi-successful coup against President Abdrabbuh Mansur Hadi led by the Houthis
 2018 Yemeni coup d'état by the Southern Movement

Yugoslavia 
 6 January 1929: Alexander I of Yugoslavia suspends the constitution and introduces a personal dictatorship. (self-coup)
 1941: by King Peter II of Yugoslavia against Regent Prince Paul of Yugoslavia in reaction for joining the Axis Powers, leading to an Axis invasion.

Zanzibar 
 January 12, 1964: John Okello led the coup to overthrow Sultan Jamshid bin Abdullah Al Said

Zambia 
 July 1, 1990: Mwamba Luchembe unsuccessfully attempted to overthrow President Kenneth Kaunda
 October 28, 1997: Steven Lungu failed to overthrow President Frederick Chiluba

Zimbabwe

Southern Rhodesia
 1965: following the colonial government's Unilateral Declaration of Independence, the colonial governor dismisses the government, but the government ignores this and instead replaces the governor with an "Officer Administering the Government"

Zimbabwe
 2007 Alleged coup d'état attempt in June 2007
 November 14, 2017: A coup resulted in the removal of longtime President Robert Mugabe

See also 
 List of coups and coup attempts – chronological listing
 List of coups and coup attempts since 2010
 List of revolutions and rebellions
 Self-coup
 Soft coup

References

External links 
 Coups in the World, 1950–Present  – Database on coups and coup attempts 1950–present, by Jonathan Powell & Clayton Thyne.
 Coups d'Etat, 1946–2015 – List of coups and coup attempts 1946–2015, by the Center for Systemic Peace.

Bibliography 
  (in cooperation with H.L.Ph. Leeuwenberg and H.B. van der Weel)
 
 

History-related lists
Lists by country
Lists of military conflicts
Politics-related lists

fr:Liste de coups d'États